

Deaths in April 

19: Grete Waitz
25: Joe Perry
26: Sadler's Wells

Current sporting seasons

Australian rules football 2011 
Australian Football League

Auto racing 2011 
Formula One
Sprint Cup
Nationwide Series
Camping World Truck Series
IRL IndyCar Series
World Rally Championship
WTCC
V8 Supercar
Formula Two
Rolex Sports Car Series
F3 Euro Series

Baseball 2011 
Major League Baseball
Nippon Professional Baseball

Basketball 2011 
NBA
NBA Playoffs
NCAA Division I men
NCAA Division I women
Euroleague
EuroLeague Women
Eurocup
EuroChallenge
Australia
France
Germany
Greece
Israel
Italy
Philippines
Commissioner's Cup
Russia
Spain
Turkey

Cricket 2011 
England:
County Championship
Clydesdale Bank 40
India:
Premier League

Darts 2011 
Premier League

Football (soccer) 2011 
National teams competitions
UEFA Euro 2012 qualifying
2012 Africa Cup of Nations qualification
International clubs competitions
UEFA (Europe) Champions League
UEFA Europa League
UEFA Women's Champions League
Copa Libertadores (South America)
AFC (Asia) Champions League
AFC Cup
CAF (Africa) Champions League
CAF Confederation Cup
CONCACAF (North & Central America) Champions League
Domestic (national) competitions
Argentina
England
France
Germany
Iran
Italy
Japan
Norway
Portugal
Russia
Scotland
Spain
Major League Soccer (USA & Canada)
Women's Professional Soccer (USA)

Golf 2011 
PGA Tour
European Tour
LPGA Tour
Champions Tour

Ice hockey 2011 
National Hockey League
Stanley Cup playoffs
Kontinental Hockey League
Elitserien
Canadian Hockey League:
OHL, QMJHL, WHL
NCAA Division I men

Motorcycle racing 2011 
Moto GP
Superbike World Championship
Supersport World Championship

Rugby league 2011 
Super League
NRL

Rugby union 2011 
Heineken Cup
European Challenge Cup
English Premiership
Celtic League
Top 14
Super Rugby
Sevens World Series

Tennis 2011 
ATP World Tour
WTA Tour

Volleyball 2011 

Domestic (national) competitions
Iranian Men's Super League
Philippine collegiate (UAAP)

Days of the month

April 30, 2011 (Saturday)

Auto racing
Sprint Cup Series:
Crown Royal Presents the Matthew and Daniel Hansen 400 in Richmond, Virginia: (1)  Kyle Busch (Toyota; Joe Gibbs Racing) (2)  Denny Hamlin (Toyota; Joe Gibbs Racing) (3)  Kasey Kahne (Toyota; Team Red Bull)
Drivers' championship standings (after 9 of 36 races): (1)  Carl Edwards (Ford; Roush Fenway Racing) 335 points (2)  Jimmie Johnson (Chevrolet; Hendrick Motorsports) 326 (3) Busch 305
V8 Supercars:
Trading Post Perth Challenge in Perth, Western Australia:
Race 7: (1) Jamie Whincup  (Triple Eight Race Engineering, Holden VE Commodore) (2) Craig Lowndes  (Triple Eight Race Engineering, Holden VE Commodore) (3) Will Davison  (Ford Performance Racing, Ford FG Falcon)
Drivers' championship standings (after 7 of 27 races): (1) Whincup 754 points (2) Lowndes 644 (3) Rick Kelly  (Kelly Racing, Holden VE Commodore) 629

Cycling
UCI World Tour:
Tour de Romandie, stage 4:  David Zabriskie  27' 57"  Richie Porte  + 2"  Lieuwe Westra  + 14"
General classification: (1) Cadel Evans   13h 00' 58" (2) Tony Martin  + 18" (3) Alexander Vinokourov  + 19"

Equestrianism
FEI World Cup Finals in Leipzig, Germany:
Vaulting final:
Women:  Simone Wiegele   Antje Hill   Anna Cavallaro 
Men:  Patric Looser   Nicolas Andréani   Viktor Brüsewitz 
Dressage final (Grand Prix Freestyle):  Adelinde Cornelissen  on Parzival  Nathalie of Sayn-Wittgenstein-Berleburg  on Digby  Ulla Salzgeber  on Herzruf's Erbe
Show jumping: Grand Prix (CSI 3*):  Denis Lynch  on All Inclusive NRW  Billy Twomey  on Romanov  McLain Ward  on Rothchild

Figure skating
World Championships in Moscow, Russia:
Ladies:  Miki Ando  195.79 points  Kim Yuna  194.50  Carolina Kostner  184.68
Ando wins her second world title, and first since 2007.
Ice dancing:  Meryl Davis/Charlie White  185.27 points  Tessa Virtue/Scott Moir  181.79  Maia Shibutani/Alex Shibutani  163.79
Davis and White become the first American pair to win an ice dancing world title.

Football (soccer)
 Greek Cup Final in Athens: AEK Athens 3–0 Atromitos
AEK win the Cup for the 14th time and first since 2002.
 Coppa Titano Final in Serravalle: Juvenes/Dogana 4–1 Virtus
Juvenes/Dogana win the Cup for the ninth time.
 Fußball-Bundesliga, matchday 32 (teams in bold qualify for the UEFA Champions League):
1. FC Köln 2–0 Bayer Leverkusen
Borussia Dortmund 2–0 1. FC Nürnberg
Standings: Borussia Dortmund 72 points, Bayer Leverkusen 64, Bayern Munich 59.
Borussia Dortmund win the title for the seventh time and their first since 2001–02.
 Premier League, matchday 32 (team in bold qualifies for the UEFA Champions League, team in italics qualifies for the UEFA Europa League):
Bangor City 1–0 The New Saints
Standings: Bangor City 70 points, The New Saints 68, Neath 58.
Bangor City win the title for the third time and their first since 1994–95.

Horse racing
English Thoroughbred Triple Crown:
2,000 Guineas Stakes in Newmarket:  Frankel (trainer: Henry Cecil; jockey: Tom Queally)  Dubawi Gold (trainer: Richard Hannon Sr.; jockey: Richard Hughes)  Native Khan (trainer: Ed Dunlop; jockey: Olivier Peslier)

Ice hockey
Men's World Championship in Slovakia:
Group C in Košice:
 5–1 
 5–4 (SO) 
Group D in Bratislava:
 5–1 
 4–2 
Stanley Cup playoffs (all series best-of-7; seeds in parentheses):
Eastern Conference Semifinals:
Game 1 in Philadelphia: (3) Boston Bruins 7, (2) Philadelphia Flyers 3. Bruins lead series 1–0.
Western Conference Semifinals:
Game 2 in Vancouver: (5) Nashville Predators 2, (1) Vancouver Canucks 1 (2OT). Series tied 1–1.

Mixed martial arts
UFC 129 in Toronto, Canada:
Welterweight Championship bout: Georges St-Pierre  (c) def. Jake Shields  by unanimous decision (50–45, 48–47, 48–47)
Featherweight Championship bout: José Aldo  (c) def. Mark Hominick  by unanimous decision (48–45, 48–46, 49–46)
Light Heavyweight bout: Lyoto Machida  def. Randy Couture  by knockout (flying front crane kick)
Light Heavyweight bout: Vladimir Matyushenko  def. Jason Brilz  by knockout (punches)
Lightweight bout: Benson Henderson  def. Mark Bocek  by unanimous decision (30–27, 30–27, 30–27)

Rugby union
Heineken Cup semi-finals:
Leinster  32–23  Toulouse in Dublin
Amlin Challenge Cup semi-finals:
Munster  12–20  Harlequins

Snooker
World Championship in Sheffield, England, semi-finals:
Judd Trump  17–15 Ding Junhui 
Trump reaches his second consecutive ranking final and becomes the second youngest player to reach a World Championship final after Stephen Hendry  in 1990.
Mark Williams  14–17 John Higgins 
Higgins reaches his third World Championship final in five years, fifth total and seventh final of the season.

Tennis
WTA Tour:
Barcelona Ladies Open in Barcelona, Spain:
Final: Roberta Vinci  def. Lucie Hradecká  4–6, 6–2, 6–2
Vinci wins the tournament for the second time in three years, for the fourth title of her career.
Estoril Open in Estoril, Portugal:
Final: Anabel Medina Garrigues  def. Kristina Barrois  6–1, 6–2.
Medina Garrigues wins the tenth title of her career.

April 29, 2011 (Friday)

American football
The U.S. 8th Circuit Court of Appeals grants the NFL's request for a temporary stay of the injunction that had ended the league's lockout of its players. Arguments on a permanent stay are expected to be heard next week.

Auto racing
Nationwide Series:
Bubba Burger 250 in Richmond, Virginia: (1)  Denny Hamlin (Toyota; Joe Gibbs Racing) (2)  Paul Menard (Chevrolet; Kevin Harvick Inc.) (3)  Justin Allgaier (Chevrolet; Turner Motorsports)
Drivers' championship standings (after 9 of 34 races): (1) Allgaier 305 points (2)  Elliott Sadler (Chevrolet; Kevin Harvick Inc.) 299 (3)  Aric Almirola (Chevrolet; JR Motorsports) 297

Basketball
EuroChallenge Final Four in Ostend, Belgium:
Spartak Saint Petersburg  64–74  Lokomotiv–Kuban Krasnodar
Krka Novo Mesto  79–65  Telenet Oostende
NBA Playoffs (all series best-of-7; seeds in parentheses):
Western Conference First round:
Game 6 in Memphis: (8) Memphis Grizzlies 99, (1) San Antonio Spurs 91. Grizzlies win series 4–2.
The Grizzlies win a playoff series for the first time in franchise history, and also become only the second No. 8 seed to knock out a No. 1 seed since the NBA expanded the first round to best-of-seven.
 NBL Grand Final (best-of-3 series):
Game 3 in Auckland: New Zealand Breakers 71–53 Cairns Taipans. Breakers win series 2–1.
The Breakers become the first team from New Zealand to capture an Australian national league title in any sport.

Cycling
UCI World Tour:
Tour de Romandie, stage 3:  Alexander Vinokourov  3h 47' 55"  Mikaël Cherel  s.t.  Tony Martin  s.t.
General classification: (1) Pavel Brutt   12h 31' 34" (2) Vinokourov + 32" (3) Damiano Cunego  + 38"

Equestrianism
FEI World Cup Finals in Leipzig, Germany:
Show jumping – second competition:  Eric Lamaze  on Hickstead  Christian Ahlmann  on Taloubet Z  Gerco Schröder  on New Orleans
Provisional standings: (1) Ahlmann & Marco Kutscher  0 penalties (3) Schröder 1
Four-in-hand driving – first competition:  Boyd Exell   Tomas Eriksson   Koos de Ronde 
Vaulting – first competition:
Women:  Simone Wiegele   Antje Hill   Anna Cavallaro 
Men:  Nicolas Andréani   Patric Looser   Viktor Brüsewitz 
FEI Nations Cup Show Jumping – Promotional League, Europe:
Nations Cup of Belgium (CSIO 4*) in Lummen:   (Janne Friederike Meyer, Heiko Schmidt, Holger Wulschner, Thomas Mühlbauer)

Figure skating
World Championships in Moscow, Russia:
Ladies short program: (1) Kim Yuna  65.91 points (2) Miki Ando  65.58 (3) Ksenia Makarova  61.62
Short dance: (1) Tessa Virtue/Scott Moir  74.29 points (2) Meryl Davis/Charlie White  73.76 (3) Nathalie Péchalat/Fabian Bourzat  70.97

Football (soccer)
OFC Under-20 Championship in Auckland, New Zealand:
Third Place Match:   2–0 
Final:   3–1  
New Zealand win the title for the fourth time, and qualifies for FIFA U-20 World Cup.

Ice hockey
Men's World Championship in Slovakia:
Group A in Bratislava:
 2–0 
 3–1 
Group B in Košice:
 1–0 (OT) 
 1–4 
Stanley Cup playoffs (all series best-of-7; seeds in parentheses):
Eastern Conference Semifinals:
Game 1 in Washington: (5) Tampa Bay Lightning 4, (1) Washington Capitals 2.  Lightning lead series 1–0.
Western Conference Semifinals:
Game 1 in San Jose: (2) San Jose Sharks 2, (3) Detroit Red Wings 1 (OT). Sharks lead series 1–0.

Rugby union
Amlin Challenge Cup semi-finals:
Stade Français  29–25  Clermont

Snooker
World Championship in Sheffield, England, semi-finals:
Judd Trump  12–12 Ding Junhui 
Mark Williams  9–7 John Higgins

April 28, 2011 (Thursday)

American football
Heisman Trophy winner Cam Newton of the Auburn Tigers is selected as the number one overall pick by the Carolina Panthers in the NFL Draft in New York City.

Basketball
NBA Playoffs (all series best-of-7; seeds in parentheses):
Eastern Conference First round:
Game 6 in Atlanta: (5) Atlanta Hawks 84, (4) Orlando Magic 81. Hawks win series 4–2.
Western Conference First round:
Game 6 in New Orleans: (2) Los Angeles Lakers 98, (7) New Orleans Hornets 80. Lakers win series 4–2.
Game 6 in Portland: (3) Dallas Mavericks 103, (6) Portland Trail Blazers 96. Mavericks win series 4–2.

Cricket
Pakistan in the West Indies:
3rd ODI in Bridgetown, Barbados:  171 (43.4/45 overs);  177/7 (40.1 overs). Pakistan win by 3 wickets; lead 5-match series 3–0.

Cycling
UCI World Tour:
Tour de Romandie, stage 2:  Damiano Cunego  4h 10' 53"  Cadel Evans  + 2"  Alexander Vinokourov  + 2"
General classification: (1) Pavel Brutt   8h 43' 39" (2) Cunego + 38" (3) Evans + 42"

Darts
Premier League, week 12 in Liverpool, England (players in bold qualify for the playoffs):
Mark Webster  4–8 Terry Jenkins 
Gary Anderson  3–8 Phil Taylor 
Raymond van Barneveld  7–7 James Wade 
Simon Whitlock  5–8 Adrian Lewis 
Standings (after 12 matches): Taylor 22 points, Anderson 16, van Barneveld 14, Lewis, Wade 11, Whitlock 10, Jenkins 8, Webster 4.

Equestrianism
FEI World Cup Finals in Leipzig, Germany:
First competition – show jumping:  Marco Kutscher  on Cash  Marcus Ehning  on Sabrina  Christian Ahlmann  on Taloubet Z

Figure skating
World Championships in Moscow, Russia:
Men:  Patrick Chan  280.98 points  Takahiko Kozuka  258.41  Artur Gachinski  241.86
Chan wins his first world title.
Pairs:  Aliona Savchenko/Robin Szolkowy  217.85 points  Tatiana Volosozhar/Maxim Trankov  210.73  Pang Qing/Tong Jian  204.12
Savchenko and Szolkowy win their third world title in four years.

Football (soccer)
African Youth Championship in South Africa:
Semifinals:
 0–2 
 0–0 (2–4 pen.) 
UEFA Europa League Semi-finals, first leg:
Benfica  2–1  Braga
Porto  5–1  Villarreal
Porto's Radamel Falcao scores four goals to set a record for a single UEFA Cup/Europa League campaign, with 16 goals.
Copa Libertadores Round of 16, first leg:
Fluminense  3–1  Libertad
Peñarol  1–1  Internacional

Ice hockey
Stanley Cup playoffs (all series best-of-7; seeds in parentheses):
Western Conference Semifinals:
Game 1 in Vancouver: (1) Vancouver Canucks 1, (5) Nashville Predators 0. Canucks lead series 1–0.

Snooker
World Championship in Sheffield, England, semi-finals:
Judd Trump  5–3 Ding Junhui 
Mark Williams  5–3 John Higgins

April 27, 2011 (Wednesday)

Basketball
NBA Playoffs (all series best-of-7; seeds in parentheses):
Eastern Conference First round:
Game 5 in Miami: (2) Miami Heat 97, (7) Philadelphia 76ers 91. Heat win series 4–1.
Western Conference First round:
Game 5 in San Antonio: (1) San Antonio Spurs 110, (8) Memphis Grizzlies 103 (OT). Grizzlies lead series 3–2.
Game 5 in Oklahoma City: (4) Oklahoma City Thunder 100, (5) Denver Nuggets 97. Thunder win series 4–1.

Cycling
UCI World Tour:
Tour de Romandie, stage 1:  Pavel Brutt  4h 27' 41"  Oleksandr Kvachuk  + 56"  Branislau Samoilau  + 1' 15"
General classification: (1) Brutt  4h 31' 26" (2) Kvachuk  + 1' 00" (3) Samoilau + 1' 22"

Figure skating
World Championships in Moscow, Russia:
Men's short program: (1) Patrick Chan  93.02 points (2) Nobunari Oda  81.81 (3) Daisuke Takahashi  80.25
Pairs short program: (1) Pang Qing/Tong Jian  74.00 points (2) Aliona Savchenko/Robin Szolkowy  72.98 (3) Tatiana Volosozhar/Maxim Trankov  70.35

Football (soccer)
OFC Under-20 Championship in Auckland, New Zealand:
Semifinals:
 3–3 (2–3 pen.) 
 6–0 
UEFA Champions League Semi-finals, first leg:
Real Madrid  0–2  Barcelona
Copa Libertadores Round of 16, first leg:
Once Caldas  1–2  Cruzeiro
Chiapas  1–1  Junior
Estudiantes  0–0  Cerro Porteño
Santos  1–0  América
AFC Cup group stage, matchday 4 (team in bold advances to the knockout stage):
Group A:
Nasaf Qarshi  9–0  Dempo
Al-Ansar  0–2  Al-Tilal
Standings (after 4 matches): Nasaf Qarshi 12 points, Al-Ansar 6, Dempo, Al-Tilal 3.
Group C:
Duhok  0–1  Al-Jaish
Al-Nasr  0–1  Al-Faisaly
Standings (after 4 matches): Al-Faisaly 9 points, Al-Jaish, Duhok 7, Al-Nasr 0.
Group E:
Al-Karamah  3–2  Al Ahed
Al-Oruba  0–5  Arbil
Standings (after 4 matches): Arbil 8 points, Al-Karamah, Al-Oruba 5, Al Ahed 3.
Group G:
Victory  0–4  Muangthong United
Tampines Rovers  3–1  Hà Nội T&T
Standings (after 4 matches): Muangthong United 10 points, Tampines Rovers 8, Hà Nội T&T 4, Victory 0.
CONCACAF Champions League Finals, second leg (first leg score in parentheses):
Real Salt Lake  0–1 (2–2)  Monterrey. Monterrey win 3–2 on aggregate.
Monterrey win the tournament for the first time.

Ice hockey
Stanley Cup playoffs (all series best-of-7; seeds in parentheses):
Eastern Conference Quarterfinals:
Game 7 in Boston: (3) Boston Bruins 4, (6) Montreal Canadiens 3 (OT). Bruins win series 4–3.
Game 7 in Pittsburgh: (5) Tampa Bay Lightning 1, (4) Pittsburgh Penguins 0. Lightning win series 4–3.

Snooker
World Championship in Sheffield, England, quarter-finals:
Mark Williams  13–5 Mark Allen 
Williams reaches the semi-finals of the event for the first time since 2003.
Judd Trump  13–5 Graeme Dott 
Ronnie O'Sullivan  10–13 John Higgins 
Ding Junhui  13–10 Mark Selby 
Ding becomes the first Chinese player to reach the semi-finals of the event.

April 26, 2011 (Tuesday)

Basketball
NBA Playoffs (all series best-of-7; seeds in parentheses):
Eastern Conference First round:
Game 5 in Chicago: (1) Chicago Bulls 116, (8) Indiana Pacers 89. Bulls win series 4–1.
Game 5 in Orlando: (4) Orlando Magic 101, (5) Atlanta Hawks 76. Hawks lead series 3–2.
Western Conference First round:
Game 5 in Los Angeles: (2) Los Angeles Lakers 106, (7) New Orleans Hornets 90. Lakers lead series 3–2.

Cycling
UCI World Tour:
Tour de Romandie, prologue & general classification:  Jonathan Castroviejo  3' 40"  Taylor Phinney  + 0"  Leigh Howard  + 1"

Football (soccer)
UEFA Champions League Semi-finals, first leg:
Schalke 04  0–2  Manchester United
Copa Libertadores Round of 16, first leg:
Grêmio  1–2  Universidad Católica
Vélez Sársfield  3–0  LDU Quito
AFC Cup group stage, matchday 4 (team in bold advances to the knockout stage):
Group B: Al-Ittihad  0–0  Shurtan Guzar
Standings (after 4 matches):  Al-Qadsia 10 points, Shurtan Guzar, Al-Ittihad 5,  Al-Saqr 1.
Group D:
Al-Talaba  1–1  Al-Suwaiq
Al-Wehdat  1–0  Al-Kuwait
Standings (after 4 matches): Al-Wehdat 12 points, Al-Kuwait 6, Al-Talaba 4, Al-Suwaiq 1.
Group F:
Sông Lam Nghệ An  4–0  Sriwijaya
TSW Pegasus  3–0  VB
Standings (after 4 matches): TSW Pegasus 9 points, Sriwijaya 7, Sông Lam Nghệ An 6, VB 1.
Group H:
Kingfisher East Bengal  3–3  South China
Chonburi  4–1  Persipura Jayapura
Standings (after 4 matches): Chonburi, Persipura Jayapura 7 points, South China 5, Kingfisher East Bengal 2.
 IFA Premiership, matchday 37 (team in bold qualifies for the UEFA Champions League, teams in italics qualify for the UEFA Europa League):
Cliftonville 3–0 Crusaders
Lisburn Distillery 0–4 Linfield
Standings: Linfield 82 points, Crusaders 73, Glentoran 65, Cliftonville 58.
Linfield retain their title and win it for the 50th time.

Ice hockey
Stanley Cup playoffs (all series best-of-7; seeds in parentheses):
Eastern Conference Quarterfinals:
Game 7 in Philadelphia: (2) Philadelphia Flyers 5, (7) Buffalo Sabres 2. Flyers win series 4–3.
Game 6 in Montreal: (6) Montreal Canadiens 2, (3) Boston Bruins 1. Series tied 3–3.
Western Conference Quarterfinals:
Game 7 in Vancouver: (1) Vancouver Canucks 2, (8) Chicago Blackhawks 1 (OT). Canucks win series 4–3.

Snooker
World Championship in Sheffield, England, quarter-finals:
Judd Trump  11–5 Graeme Dott 
Mark Williams  11–5 Mark Allen 
Ding Junhui  5–3 Mark Selby 
Ronnie O'Sullivan  4–4 John Higgins

April 25, 2011 (Monday)

American football
A U.S. federal judge issues an injunction against the NFL, which temporarily ends the league's lockout of its players. The NFL appeals the decision and asks for the injunction to be stayed pending appeal.

Basketball
NBA Playoffs (all series best-of-7; seeds in parentheses):
Western Conference First round:
Game 4 in Memphis: (8) Memphis Grizzlies 104, (1) San Antonio Spurs 86. Grizzlies lead series 3–1.
Game 5 in Dallas: (3) Dallas Mavericks 93, (6) Portland Trail Blazers 82. Mavericks lead series 3–2.
Game 4 in Denver: (5) Denver Nuggets 104, (4) Oklahoma City Thunder 101. Thunder lead series 3–1.

Cricket
Pakistan in the West Indies:
2nd ODI in Gros Islet, Saint Lucia:  220 (50 overs);  223/3 (48 overs; Ahmed Shehzad 102). Pakistan win by 7 wickets; lead 5-match series 2–0.

Equestrianism
Badminton Horse Trials (CCI 4*) in Badminton, Gloucestershire, England:  Mark Todd  on Land Vision  Piggy French  on Jakata  Mary King  on Imperial Cavalier
Todd wins the event for the fourth time, and his first since 1996.

Football (soccer)
OFC Under-20 Championship in Auckland, New Zealand (teams in bold advance to the semifinals):
Group A:
 5–1 
 2–5 
Final standings: Vanuatu 9 points, Fiji, Papua New Guinea 4, American Samoa 0.
Group B:  10–0 
Final standings: New Zealand 6 points,  3, New Caledonia 0.
 Liechtenstein Cup Final in Vaduz: Vaduz 5–0 Eschen Mauren
Vaduz defeat Eschen Mauren in the final for the third successive year, to win the Cup for the 14th successive year and the 40th time overall.

Ice hockey
Women's World Championship in Switzerland:
Bronze medal game:   3–2 (OT) 
Final:   2–3 (OT)  
The United States defeat Canada in the final for the third successive time, to win their fourth world title.
Stanley Cup playoffs (all series best-of-7; seeds in parentheses):
Eastern Conference Quarterfinals:
Game 6 in Tampa: (5) Tampa Bay Lightning 4, (4) Pittsburgh Penguins 2. Series tied 3–3.
Western Conference Quarterfinals:
Game 6 in Los Angeles: (2) San Jose Sharks 4, (7) Los Angeles Kings 3 (OT). Sharks win series 4–2.

Snooker
World Championship in Sheffield, England, last 16:
Stephen Hendry  4–13 Mark Selby 
Selby compiles six century breaks; the first player to do so at the Crucible, in a best of 25 match.
Rory McLeod  7–13 John Higgins 
Ding Junhui  13–12 Stuart Bingham 
Ding reaches the quarter-finals of the event for the first time.
Shaun Murphy  10–13 Ronnie O'Sullivan

April 24, 2011 (Sunday)

Auto racing
World Touring Car Championship:
Race of Belgium in Heusden-Zolder:
Race 1: (1) Robert Huff  (Chevrolet; Chevrolet Cruze) (2) Alain Menu  (Chevrolet; Chevrolet Cruze) (3) Yvan Muller  (Chevrolet; Chevrolet Cruze)
Race 2: (1) Gabriele Tarquini  (Lukoil – SUNRED; SEAT León) (2) Menu (3) Tiago Monteiro  (SUNRED Engineering; SEAT León)
Drivers' championship standings (after 2 of 12 rounds): (1) Huff 70 points (2) Menu 69 (3) Tarquini 51

Basketball
NBA Playoffs (all series best-of-7; seeds in parentheses):
Eastern Conference First round:
Game 4 in Philadelphia: (7) Philadelphia 76ers 86, (2) Miami Heat 82. Heat lead series 3–1.
Game 4 in New York: (3) Boston Celtics 101, (6) New York Knicks 89. Celtics win series 4–0.
Game 4 in Atlanta: (5) Atlanta Hawks 88, (4) Orlando Magic 85. Hawks lead series 3–1.
Western Conference First round:
Game 4 in New Orleans: (7) New Orleans Hornets 93, (2) Los Angeles Lakers 88. Series tied 2–2.

Cycling
UCI World Tour:
Liège–Bastogne–Liège:  Philippe Gilbert  6h 13' 18"  Fränk Schleck  s.t.  Andy Schleck  s.t.
Gilbert becomes only the second rider to win the three Ardennes classics in the same season.
World Tour standings (after 12 of 27 races): (1) Gilbert 356 points (2) Fabian Cancellara  236 (3) Matthew Goss  203

Football (soccer)
African Youth Championship in South Africa: (teams in bold advance to the semifinals and qualify for FIFA U-20 World Cup)
Group B:
 1–1 
 2–0 
Final standings: Cameroon 7 points, Nigeria 6, Ghana 2, Gambia 1.
CAF Champions League Second round, first leg: Al-Hilal  1–0  Club Africain
CAF Confederation Cup Second round, first leg:
FUS Rabat  1–1  1º de Agosto
Maghreb Fez  5–1  Al-Khartoum
Saint Eloi Lupopo  2–1  Sofapaka
Difaa El Jadida  3–0  AS Adema
Sunshine Stars  2–0  USFA
Haras El Hodood  2–1  Motema Pembe

Golf
PGA Tour:
The Heritage in Hilton Head Island, South Carolina:
Winner: Brandt Snedeker  272 (−12)PO
Snedeker defeats Luke Donald  on the third playoff hole, to win his second PGA Tour title and first since 2007. Snedeker's playoff win also denies Donald the number 1 spot in the world rankings, with Lee Westwood  replacing Martin Kaymer  at the top.
European Tour:
Volvo China Open in Suzhou, China:
Winner: Nicolas Colsaerts  264 (−24)
Colsaerts becomes the second Belgian to win a European Tour tournament, after Philippe Toussaint in 1974.
Champions Tour:
Liberty Mutual Legends of Golf in Savannah, Georgia:
Winners: David Eger  & Mark McNulty  189 (−27)PO
Eger and McNulty defeat Scott Hoch  & Kenny Perry  on the second playoff hole; Eger wins his fourth Champions Tour title and McNulty wins his eighth.

Ice hockey
Women's World Championship in Switzerland:
5th place game:  3–2 (SO) 
Relegation series, game 2:  1–2 (SO) . Slovakia win best-of-3 series 2–0.
World U18 Championships in Germany:
Bronze medal game:   6–4 
Final:   3–4 (OT)  
The United States win their third consecutive world title, and their sixth overall.
Stanley Cup playoffs (all series best-of-7; seeds in parentheses):
Eastern Conference Quarterfinals:
Game 6 in Buffalo: (2) Philadelphia Flyers 5, (7) Buffalo Sabres 4 (OT). Series tied 3–3.
Western Conference Quarterfinals:
Game 6 in Chicago: (8) Chicago Blackhawks 4, (1) Vancouver Canucks 3 (OT). Series tied 3–3.
Game 6 in Nashville: (5) Nashville Predators 4, (4) Anaheim Ducks 2. Predators win series 4–2.

Judo
European Championships in Istanbul, Turkey:
Men's team:       & 
Women's team:       &

Snooker
World Championship in Sheffield, England, last 16:
Shaun Murphy  7–9 Ronnie O'Sullivan 
Stephen Hendry  4–12 Mark Selby 
Ding Junhui  7–9 Stuart Bingham 
Rory McLeod  5–10 John Higgins

Surfing
Men's World Tour:
Rip Curl Pro at the Bells Beach, Australia: (1) Joel Parkinson  (2) Mick Fanning  (3) Adriano De Souza  & Jordy Smith 
Standings (after 2 of 11 events): (1) Kelly Slater  15,200 points (2) Joel Parkinson  14,000 (3) Smith 13,000

Tennis
ATP World Tour:
Barcelona Open Banco Sabadell in Barcelona, Spain:
Final: Rafael Nadal  def. David Ferrer  6–2, 6–4
Nadal wins the event for the sixth time in seven years, and the 45th title of his career.
WTA Tour:
Porsche Tennis Grand Prix in Stuttgart, Germany:
Final: Julia Görges  def. Caroline Wozniacki  7–6(3), 6–3
Görges wins her second WTA Tour title.
Grand Prix SAR La Princesse Lalla Meryem in Fes, Morocco:
Final: Alberta Brianti  def. Simona Halep  6–4, 6–3
Brianti wins her first WTA Tour title.

April 23, 2011 (Saturday)

Auto racing
Nationwide Series:
Nashville 300 in Gladeville, Tennessee: (1)  Carl Edwards (Ford; Roush Fenway Racing) (2)  Kyle Busch (Toyota; Joe Gibbs Racing) (3)  Brad Keselowski (Dodge; Penske Racing)
Drivers' championship standings (after 8 of 34 races): (1)  Justin Allgaier (Chevrolet; Turner Motorsports) &  Ricky Stenhouse Jr. (Ford; Roush Fenway Racing) 264 points (3)  Jason Leffler (Chevrolet; Turner Motorsports) 262

Basketball
NBA Playoffs (all series best-of-7; seeds in parentheses):
Eastern Conference First round:
Game 4 in Indianapolis: (8) Indiana Pacers 89, (1) Chicago Bulls 84. Bulls lead series 3–1.
Western Conference First round:
Game 3 in Memphis: (8) Memphis Grizzlies 91, (1) San Antonio Spurs 88. Grizzlies lead series 2–1.
Game 4 in Portland: (6) Portland Trail Blazers 84, (3) Dallas Mavericks 82. Series tied 2–2.
Game 3 in Denver: (4) Oklahoma City Thunder 97, (5) Denver Nuggets 94. Thunder lead series 3–0.

Cricket
Pakistan in the West Indies:
1st ODI in Gros Islet, Saint Lucia:  221/6 (50 overs);  222/2 (41.3 overs). Pakistan win by 8 wickets; lead 5-match series 1–0.

Curling
World Mixed Doubles Championship in Saint Paul, Minnesota, United States:
Semifinals:
Sweden  7–9 
Switzerland  8–3 
Bronze medal game: Sweden  6–8  
Final:  Switzerland  11–2  
Switzerland win the title for the third time.
World Senior Men's Championship in Saint Paul, Minnesota, United States:
Semifinals:
Canada  11–1 
United States  11–2 
Bronze medal game:  Australia  8–5 
Final:  Canada  5–4  
Canada win the title for the seventh time.
World Senior Women's Championship in Saint Paul, Minnesota, United States:
Semifinals:
Canada  6–5 
United States  5–7 
Bronze medal game: United States  4–5  
Final:  Canada  9–2  
Canada win the title for the fourth successive time and seventh time overall.

Football (soccer)
African Youth Championship in South Africa: (teams in bold advance to the semifinals and qualify for FIFA U-20 World Cup)
Group A:
 0–1 
 1–1 
Final standings: Mali 7 points, Egypt 6, South Africa 3, Lesotho 1.
OFC Under-20 Championship in Auckland, New Zealand (team in bold advances to the semifinals):
Group A:
 0–2 
 1–5 
Standings (after 2 matches): Vanuatu 6 points, Papua New Guinea 4, Fiji 1, American Samoa 0.
Group B:  0–3 
Standings: New Zealand 3 points (1 match), Solomon Islands 3 (2),  0 (1).
CAF Champions League Second round, first leg:
Inter Luanda  1–1  MC Alger
Espérance ST  5–0  Diaraf
Wydad Casablanca  1–0  TP Mazembe
ZESCO United  0–0  Al-Ahly
CAF Confederation Cup Second round, first leg:
Missile  3–0  JS Kabylie
Kaduna United  –  Étoile Sahel postponed
 Prva HNL, matchday 26 (team in bold qualifies for the UEFA Champions League):
Dinamo Zagreb 1–0 Osijek
Slaven Belupo 1–2 Hajduk Split
Standings: Dinamo Zagreb 64 points, Hajduk Split 51, RNK Split 43.
Dinamo Zagreb win the title for the sixth successive time, and 13th time overall.
 Coupe de la Ligue Final in Saint-Denis: Marseille 1–0 Montpellier
Marseille win the Cup for the second successive time.
 Taça da Liga Final in Coimbra: Paços de Ferreira 1–2 Benfica
Benfica win the Cup for the third successive time.
 Finnish League Cup Final in Espoo: FC Honka 3–0 Tampere United
FC Honka win the Cup for the second successive time.

Ice hockey
Women's World Championship in Switzerland:
Semifinals:
 4–1 
 5–1 
World U18 Championships in Germany:
Semifinals:
 3–1 
 5–4 (OT) 
5th place game:  6–0 
Relegation Round:
 2–6 
 4–2 
Final standings: Switzerland 9 points, Czech Republic 6, Norway 3, Slovakia 0.
Stanley Cup playoffs (all series best-of-7; seeds in parentheses):
Eastern Conference Quarterfinals:
Game 5 in Washington: (1) Washington Capitals 3, (8) New York Rangers 1. Capitals win series 4–1.
Game 5 in Boston: (3) Boston Bruins 2, (6) Montreal Canadiens 1 (2OT). Bruins lead series 3–2.
Game 5 in Pittsburgh: (5) Tampa Bay Lightning 8, (4) Pittsburgh Penguins 2. Penguins lead series 3–2.
Western Conference Quarterfinals:
Game 5 in San Jose: (7) Los Angeles Kings 3, (2) San Jose Sharks 1.  Sharks lead series 3–2.

Judo
European Championships in Istanbul, Turkey:
Men:
−90 kg:  Ilias Iliadis   Kirill Denisov   Varlam Liparteliani  & Marcus Nyman 
−100 kg:  Amel Mekić   Levan Zhorzholiani   Jevgeņijs Borodavko  & Irakli Tsirekidze 
+100 kg:  Teddy Riner   Barna Bor   Martin Padar  & Janusz Wojnarowicz 
Women:
−78 kg:  Audrey Tcheumeo   Lucie Louette   Luise Malzahn  & Ana Velensek 
+78 kg:  Elena Ivashchenko   Anne Sophie Mondiere   Tea Donguzashvili  & Lucija Polavder

Snooker
World Championship in Sheffield, England, last 16:
Judd Trump  13–6 Martin Gould 
Graeme Dott  13–11 Ali Carter 
Mark Allen  13–12 Barry Hawkins 
Shaun Murphy  2–6 Ronnie O'Sullivan 
Stephen Hendry  1–7 Mark Selby

Surfing
Women's World Tour:
Rip Curl Women's Pro at Bells Beach, Australia: (1) Sally Fitzgibbons  (2) Carissa Moore  (3) Silvana Lima  & Stephanie Gilmore 
Standings (standings after 2 of 7 events): (1) Moore 18,000 points (2) Fitzgibbons 16,500 (3) Tyler Wright  13,200

April 22, 2011 (Friday)

Basketball
NBA Playoffs (all series best-of-7; seeds in parentheses):
Eastern Conference First round:
Game 3 in New York: (3) Boston Celtics 113, (6) New York Knicks 96. Celtics lead series 3–0.
Game 3 in Atlanta: (5) Atlanta Hawks 88, (4) Orlando Magic 84. Hawks lead series 2–1.
Western Conference First round:
Game 3 in New Orleans: (2) Los Angeles Lakers 100, (7) New Orleans Hornets 86. Lakers lead series 2–1.

Ice hockey
Women's World Championship in Switzerland:
Quarterfinals:
 1–5 
 4–5 (OT) 
Relegation series, game 1:  1–0 . Slovakia lead best-of-3 series 1–0.
Stanley Cup playoffs (all series best-of-7; seeds in parentheses):
Eastern Conference Quarterfinals:
Game 5 in Philadelphia:  (7) Buffalo Sabres 4, (2) Philadelphia Flyers 3 (OT). Sabres lead series 3–2.
Western Conference Quarterfinals:
Game 5 in Anaheim: (5) Nashville Predators 4, (4) Anaheim Ducks 3 (OT). Predators lead series 3–2.

Judo
European Championships in Istanbul, Turkey:
Men:
−73 kg:  João Pina   Murat Kodzokov   Jaromír Ježek  & Hasan Vanlioglu 
−81 kg:  Elnur Mammadli   Sergiu Toma   Ole Bischof  & Sirazhudin Magomedov 
Women:
−63 kg:  Gévrise Émane   Anicka van Emden   Hilde Drexler  & Urška Žolnir 
−70 kg:  Edith Bosch   Cecilia Blanco   Erica Barbieri  & Lucie Décosse

Snooker
World Championship in Sheffield, England, last 16:
Mark Williams  13–4 Jamie Cope 
Judd Trump  11–5 Martin Gould 
Graeme Dott  8–8 Ali Carter 
Mark Allen  3–5 Barry Hawkins

April 21, 2011 (Thursday)

Basketball
NBA Playoffs (all series best-of-7; seeds in parentheses):
Eastern Conference First round:
Game 3 in Indianapolis: (1) Chicago Bulls 88, (8) Indiana Pacers 84. Bulls lead series 3–0.
Game 3 in Philadelphia: (2) Miami Heat 100, (7) Philadelphia 76ers 94. Heat lead series 3–0.
Western Conference First round:
Game 3 in Portland: (6) Portland Trail Blazers 97, (3) Dallas Mavericks 92. Mavericks lead series 2–1.

Cricket
Pakistan in the West Indies:
Only T20I in Gros Islet, Saint Lucia:  150/7 (20 overs);  143/9 (20 overs). West Indies win by 7 runs.

Darts
Premier League, week 11 in Birmingham, England (player in bold qualifies for the playoffs):
James Wade  8–1 Mark Webster 
Terry Jenkins  7–7 Raymond van Barneveld 
Simon Whitlock  6–8 Gary Anderson 
Phil Taylor  8–3 Adrian Lewis 
Standings (after 11 matches): Taylor 20 points, Anderson 16, van Barneveld 13, Whitlock, Wade 10, Lewis 9, Jenkins 6, Webster 4.

Football (soccer)
African Youth Championship in South Africa (team in bold advances to the semifinals and qualifies for FIFA U-20 World Cup):
Group B:
 0–1 
 1–1 
Standings (after 2 matches): Cameroon 6 points, Nigeria 3, Ghana, Gambia 1.
OFC Under-20 Championship in Auckland, New Zealand:
Group A:
 7–0 
 0–0 
Group B:  1–3 
 Superliga, matchday 26 (team in bold qualifies for the UEFA Champions League):
Odense 1–2 Nordsjælland
Lyngby 1–2 Copenhagen
Standings: Copenhagen 67 points, Odense 41, Brøndby 39.
Copenhagen win the title for the fifth time in six years, and the ninth time overall.

Ice hockey
World U18 Championships in Germany:
Quarterfinals:
 5–2 
 4–3 
Relegation Round:
 4–1 
 4–3 
Standings (after 2 games): Switzerland, Czech Republic 6 points, Slovakia, Norway 0.
Slovakia and Norway are relegated to Division I in 2012.
Stanley Cup playoffs (all series best-of-7; seeds in parentheses):
Eastern Conference Quarterfinals:
Game 4 in Montreal: (3) Boston Bruins 5, (6) Montreal Canadiens 4 (OT). Series tied 2–2.
Western Conference Quarterfinals:
Game 5 in Vancouver: (8) Chicago Blackhawks 5, (1) Vancouver Canucks 0. Canucks lead series 3–2.
Game 4 in Los Angeles: (2) San Jose Sharks 6, (7) Los Angeles Kings 3. Sharks lead series 3–1.

Judo
European Championships in Istanbul, Turkey:
Men:
−60 kg:  Georgii Zantaraia   Betkil Shukvani   Arsen Galstyan  & Elio Verde 
−66 kg:  Miklós Ungvári   Tarian Karimov   Alim Gadanov  & Colin Oates 
Women:
−48 kg:  Alina Alexandra Dumitru   Éva Csernoviczki   Frédérique Jossinet  & Laetitia Payet 
−52 kg:  Pénélope Bonna   Joana Ramos   Ana Carrascosa  & Sophie Cox 
−57 kg:  Sabrina Filzmoser   Telma Monteiro   Corina Oana Caprioriu  & Irina Zabludina

Snooker
World Championship in Sheffield, England:
Last 32:
John Higgins  10–5 Stephen Lee 
Mark Selby  10–1 Jimmy Robertson 
Last 16:
Mark Williams  7–1 Jamie Cope 
Judd Trump  5–3 Martin Gould

April 20, 2011 (Wednesday)

Baseball
Major League Baseball news: Commissioner Bud Selig announces that MLB will take over the day-to-day operations of the Los Angeles Dodgers due to financial and governance issues caused by the bitter divorce of owners Frank and Jamie McCourt.

Basketball
NBA Playoffs (all series best-of-7; seeds in parentheses):
Western Conference First round:
Game 2 in Oklahoma City: (4) Oklahoma City Thunder 106, (5) Denver Nuggets 89. Thunder lead series 2–0.
Game 2 in San Antonio: (1) San Antonio Spurs 93, (8) Memphis Grizzlies 87. Series tied 1–1.
Game 2 in Los Angeles: (2) Los Angeles Lakers 87, (7) New Orleans Hornets 78. Series tied 1–1.

Cycling
UCI World Tour:
La Flèche Wallonne:  Philippe Gilbert  4h 54' 57"  Joaquim Rodríguez  + 3"  Samuel Sánchez  + 5"
World Tour standings (after 11 of 27 races): (1) Gilbert 256 points (2) Fabian Cancellara  236 (3) Matthew Goss  203

Football (soccer)
Friendly international: (top 10 in FIFA World Rankings)
(5)  2–2 
African Youth Championship in South Africa (team in bold advances to the semifinals and qualifies for FIFA U-20 World Cup):
Group A:
 1–2 
 1–0 
Standings (after 2 matches): Mali 6 points, Egypt, South Africa 3, Lesotho 0.
Copa Libertadores second stage (teams in bold advance to the knockout stage):
Group 3:
Nacional  0–0  América
Argentinos Juniors  2–4  Fluminense
Final standings: América 10 points, Fluminense, Nacional 8, Argentinos Juniors 7.
Group 5:
Colo-Colo  2–3  Cerro Porteño
Santos  3–1  Deportivo Táchira
Final standings: Cerro Porteño, Santos 11 points, Colo-Colo 9, Deportivo Táchira 2.
AFC Champions League group stage, matchday 4 (teams in bold advance to the knockout stage):
Group A:
Al-Gharafa  1–0  Sepahan
Al-Jazira  2–3  Al-Hilal
Standings (after 4 matches): Sepahan, Al-Hilal 9 points, Al-Gharafa 4, Al-Jazira 1.
Group C:
Persepolis  1–3  Bunyodkor
Al-Ittihad  0–0  Al-Wahda
Standings (after 4 matches): Al-Ittihad 10 points, Bunyodkor 5, Al-Wahda 3, Persepolis 2.
Group E:
Melbourne Victory  2–1  Tianjin Teda
Gamba Osaka  3–1  Jeju United
Standings (after 4 matches): Gamba Osaka 8 points, Tianjin Teda 7, Jeju United 6, Melbourne Victory 4.
Group G:
Shandong Luneng  5–0  Arema
Jeonbuk Hyundai Motors  1–0  Cerezo Osaka
Standings (after 4 matches): Jeonbuk Hyundai Motors 9 points, Shandong Luneng 7, Cerezo Osaka 6, Arema 1.
CONCACAF Champions League Finals, first leg:
Monterrey  2–2  Real Salt Lake
 Copa del Rey Final in Valencia: FC Barcelona 0–1 (a.e.t.) Real Madrid
Real Madrid win their first Copa del Rey since 1993, and their 18th overall.

Ice hockey
Women's World Championship in Switzerland: (team in bold advances to the semifinals, teams in italics advance to the quarterfinals)
Group A:
 1–4 
 9–1 
Final standings: United States 9 points, Sweden 6, Russia 3, Slovakia 0.
Stanley Cup playoffs (all series best-of-7; seeds in parentheses):
Eastern Conference Quarterfinals:
Game 4 in New York: (1) Washington Capitals 4, (8) New York Rangers 3 (2OT). Capitals lead series 3–1.
Game 4 in Buffalo: (7) Buffalo Sabres 1, (2) Philadelphia Flyers 0. Series tied 2–2.
Game 4 in Tampa: (4) Pittsburgh Penguins 3, (5) Tampa Bay Lightning 2 (2OT). Penguins lead series 3–1.
Western Conference Quarterfinals:
Game 4 in Glendale, Arizona: (3) Detroit Red Wings 6, (6) Phoenix Coyotes 3. Red Wings win series 4–0.
Game 4 in Nashville: (4) Anaheim Ducks 6, (5) Nashville Predators 3. Series tied 2–2.

Snooker
World Championship in Sheffield, England, last 32:
Marco Fu  8–10 Martin Gould 
Ricky Walden  6–10 Rory McLeod 
McLeod reaches the last 16 of the event for the first time.
Graeme Dott  10–7 Mark King 
Mark Allen  10–9 Matthew Stevens 
John Higgins  6–3 Stephen Lee 
Mark Selby  8–1 Jimmy Robertson

U.S. college sports
Conference realignment: The University of Massachusetts Amherst (UMass) announces that it will upgrade its football program from Division I FCS to FBS and accept an invitation to become a football-only member of the Mid-American Conference effective in 2012.

April 19, 2011 (Tuesday)

Basketball
NBA Playoffs (all series best-of-7; seeds in parentheses):
Eastern Conference First round:
Game 2 in Boston: (3) Boston Celtics 96, (6) New York Knicks 93. Celtics lead series 2–0.
Game 2 in Orlando: (4) Orlando Magic 88, (5) Atlanta Hawks 82. Series tied 1–1.
Western Conference First round:
Game 2 in Dallas: (3) Dallas Mavericks 101, (6) Portland Trail Blazers 89. Mavericks lead series 2–0.

Football (soccer)
Copa Libertadores second stage (teams in bold advance to the knockout stage):
Group 1:
Libertad  2–0  San Luis
Universidad San Martín  0–2  Once Caldas
Final standings: Libertad 14 points, Once Caldas 7, Universidad San Martín 6, San Luis 5.
Group 6:
Jorge Wilstermann  2–1  Chiapas
Internacional  2–0  Emelec
Final standings: Internacional 13 points, Jaguares 9, Emelec 8, Jorge Wilstermann 4.
AFC Champions League group stage, matchday 4:
Group B:
Pakhtakor  2–1  Esteghlal
Al-Nassr  1–1  Al-Sadd
Standings (after 4 matches): Al-Sadd 8 points, Al-Nassr 5, Esteghlal, Pakhtakor 4.
Group D:
Emirates  2–1  Al-Shabab
Zob Ahan  1–0  Al-Rayyan
Standings (after 4 matches): Zob Ahan 10 points, Emirates 6, Al-Shabab 5, Al-Rayyan 1.
Group F:
FC Seoul  0–2  Nagoya Grampus
Al-Ain  1–0  Hangzhou Greentown
Standings (after 4 matches): Nagoya Grampus, FC Seoul 7 points, Al-Ain, Hangzhou Greentown 4.
Group H:
Kashima Antlers  1–1  Suwon Samsung Bluewings
Shanghai Shenhua  2–3  Sydney FC
Standings (after 4 matches): Suwon Samsung Bluewings, Kashima Antlers 6 points, Sydney FC 5, Shanghai Shenhua 2.

Ice hockey
Women's World Championship in Switzerland: (team in bold advances to the semifinals, teams in italics advance to the quarterfinals)
Group B:
 2–0 
 6–1 
Final standings: Canada 9 points, Switzerland 5, Finland 4, Kazakhstan 0.
World U18 Championships in Germany: (teams in bold advance to the semifinals, teams in italics advance to the quarterfinals)
Group A:
 8–3 
 7–3 
Final standings: United States 12 points, Russia 8, Germany 4, Switzerland,  3.
Group B:
 5–3 
 4–2 
Final standings: Sweden, Canada 9 points, Finland, Czech Republic 6,  0.
Stanley Cup playoffs (all series best-of-7; seeds in parentheses):
Western Conference Quarterfinals:
Game 4 in Chicago: (8) Chicago Blackhawks 7, (1) Vancouver Canucks 2. Canucks lead series 3–1.
Game 3 in Los Angeles: (2) San Jose Sharks 6, (7) Los Angeles Kings 5 (OT). Sharks lead series 2–1.

Snooker
World Championship in Sheffield, England, last 32:
Ronnie O'Sullivan  10–2 Dominic Dale 
Peter Ebdon  8–10 Stuart Bingham 
Marco Fu  6–3 Martin Gould 
Ricky Walden  4–4 Rory McLeod 
Graeme Dott  6–3 Mark King 
Mark Allen  4–5 Matthew Stevens

April 18, 2011 (Monday)

Athletics
World Marathon Majors:
Boston Marathon:
Men:  Geoffrey Mutai  2:03:02 (course record)  Moses Mosop  2:03:06  Gebregziabher Gebremariam  2:04:53
Mutai runs almost a minute quicker than the world record set by Haile Gebrselassie  in Berlin in 2008, but course conditions make his time non-ratifiable.
WMM standings: (1) Emmanuel Kipchirchir Mutai  55 points (2) Tsegaye Kebede  41 (3) Geoffrey Mutai 40
Women:  Caroline Kilel  2:22.36  Desiree Davila  2:22:38  Sharon Cherop  2:22:43
WMM standings: (1) Liliya Shobukhova  65 points (2) Mary Jepkosgei Keitany  & Edna Kiplagat  35

Basketball
NBA Playoffs (all series best-of-7; seeds in parentheses):
Eastern Conference First round:
Game 2 in Chicago: (1) Chicago Bulls 96, (8) Indiana Pacers 90. Bulls lead series 2–0.
Game 2 in Miami: (2) Miami Heat 94, (7) Philadelphia 76ers 73. Heat lead series 2–0.

Football (soccer)
African Youth Championship in South Africa:
Group B:
 1–2 
 1–0

Ice hockey
Women's World Championship in Switzerland:
Group A:
 3–0 
 1–13 
Standings (after 2 games): United States, Sweden 6 points, Slovakia, Russia 0.
World U18 Championships in Germany: (team in bold advances to the semifinals)
Group A:  0–4 
Standings:  9 points (3 games),  5 (3), Germany 4 (3),  3 (3), Slovakia 3 (4).
Group B:  5–0 
Standings: Canada 9 points (3 games),  6 (3),  3 (3), Norway 0 (4).
Stanley Cup playoffs (all series best-of-7; seeds in parentheses):
Eastern Conference Quarterfinals:
Game 3 in Buffalo: (2) Philadelphia Flyers 4, (7) Buffalo Sabres 2. Flyers lead series 2–1.
Game 3 in Montreal: (3) Boston Bruins 4, (6) Montreal Canadiens 2. Canadiens lead series 2–1.
Game 3 in Tampa: (4) Pittsburgh Penguins 3, (5) Tampa Bay Lightning 2. Penguins lead series 2–1.
Western Conference Quarterfinals:
Game 3 in Glendale, Arizona: (3) Detroit Red Wings 4, (6) Phoenix Coyotes 2. Red Wings lead series 3–0.

Snooker
World Championship in Sheffield, England, last 32:
Ding Junhui  10–2 Jamie Burnett 
Stephen Hendry  10–9 Joe Perry 
Stephen Maguire  9–10 Barry Hawkins 
Hawkins reaches the last 16 of the event for the first time.
Ronnie O'Sullivan  7–2 Dominic Dale 
O'Sullivan compiles his 100th century break at the Crucible.
Peter Ebdon  4–5 Stuart Bingham

April 17, 2011 (Sunday)

Athletics
World Marathon Majors:
London Marathon:
Men:  Emmanuel Kipchirchir Mutai  2:04:38 (Course record)  Martin Lel  2:05:45  Patrick Makau Musyoki  s.t.
WMM standings: (1) Mutai 55 points (2) Tsegaye Kebede  41 (3) Makau 35
Women:  Mary Jepkosgei Keitany  2:19:17  Liliya Shobukhova  2:20:15  Edna Kiplagat  2:20:46
WMM standings: (1) Shobukhova 65 points (2) Keitany & Kiplagat 35

Auto racing
Formula One:
 in Shanghai, China: (1) Lewis Hamilton  (McLaren–Mercedes) (2) Sebastian Vettel  (Red Bull–Renault) (3) Mark Webber  (Red Bull-Renault)
Drivers' championship standings (after 3 of 19 races): (1) Vettel 68 points (2) Hamilton 47 (3) Jenson Button  (McLaren-Mercedes) 38
Sprint Cup Series:
Aaron's 499 in Talladega, Alabama: (1)  Jimmie Johnson (Chevrolet; Hendrick Motorsports) (2)  Clint Bowyer (Chevrolet; Richard Childress Racing) (3)  Jeff Gordon (Chevrolet; Hendrick Motorsports)
Johnson wins the race by 0.002 seconds, tying the closest finish in NASCAR history.
Drivers' championship standings (after 8 of 36 races): (1)  Carl Edwards (Ford; Roush Fenway Racing) 295 points (2) Johnson 290 (3)  Dale Earnhardt Jr. (Chevrolet; Hendrick Motorsports) 276
IndyCar Series:
Toyota Grand Prix of Long Beach in Long Beach, California: (1) Mike Conway  (Andretti Autosport) (2) Ryan Briscoe  (Team Penske) (3) Dario Franchitti  (Chip Ganassi Racing)
Drivers' championship standings (after 3 of 17 races): (1) Franchitti 122 points (2) Will Power  (Team Penske) 115 (3) Tony Kanaan  (KV Racing Technology – Lotus) 87
V8 Supercars:
ITM Hamilton 400 in Hamilton, New Zealand:
Race 6: (1) Shane van Gisbergen  (Stone Brothers Racing, Ford FG Falcon) (2) Lee Holdsworth  (Garry Rogers Motorsport, Holden VE Commodore) (3) Garth Tander  (Holden Racing Team, Holden VE Commodore)
Drivers' championship standings (after 6 of 27 races): (1) Jamie Whincup  (Triple Eight Race Engineering, Holden VE Commodore) 654 points (2) Rick Kelly  (Kelly Racing, Holden VE Commodore) 573 (3) Craig Lowndes  (Triple Eight Race Engineering, Holden VE Commodore) 552

Basketball
EuroCup Final Four in Treviso, Italy:
Third place game:  Cedevita Zagreb  59–57  Benetton Basket Bwin
Final:  UNICS Kazan  92–77   Cajasol
UNICS win the title for the first time, becoming the second Russian team to win the tournament.
NBA Playoffs (all series best-of-7; seeds in parentheses):
Eastern Conference First round:
Game 1 in Boston: (3) Boston Celtics 87, (6) New York Knicks 85. Celtics lead series 1–0.
Western Conference First round:
Game 1 in San Antonio: (8) Memphis Grizzlies 101, (1) San Antonio Spurs 98. Grizzlies lead series 1–0.
The Grizzlies win a playoff game for the first time in the 16-year history of the franchise, having been swept 4–0 in their three previous appearances.
Game 1 in Los Angeles: (7) New Orleans Hornets 109, (2) Los Angeles Lakers 100. Hornets lead series 1–0.
Game 1 in Oklahoma City: (4) Oklahoma City Thunder 107, (5) Denver Nuggets 103. Thunder lead series 1–0.

Cycling
UCI World Tour:
Amstel Gold Race:  Philippe Gilbert  6h 30' 44"  Joaquim Rodríguez  + 2"  Simon Gerrans  + 4"
World Tour standings (after 10 of 27 races): (1) Fabian Cancellara  236 points (2) Matthew Goss  203 (3) Andreas Klöden  & Michele Scarponi  202

Football (soccer)
African Youth Championship in South Africa:
Group A:
 2–4 
 2–0 
OFC Champions League Final, second leg (first leg score in parentheses):
Auckland City  4–0 (2–1)  Amicale. Auckland City win 6–1 on aggregate.
Auckland City win the title for the third time.
UEFA Women's Champions League Semi-finals, second leg (first leg score in parentheses):
Turbine Potsdam  1–0 (2–2)  Duisburg. Turbine Potsdam win 3–2 on aggregate.
 Premier League, matchday 25 (team in bold qualifies for the UEFA Champions League):
Valletta 1–0 Marsaxlokk
Standings: Valletta 39 points, Floriana 27, Birkirkara 25.
Valletta win the title for the 20th time.

Golf
PGA Tour:
Valero Texas Open in San Antonio:
Winner: Brendan Steele  280 (−8)
Steele wins his first PGA Tour title.
European Tour:
Maybank Malaysian Open in Kuala Lumpur, Malaysia:
Winner: Matteo Manassero  272 (−16)
Manassero wins his second career European Tour title, two days before his 18th birthday.
Champions Tour:
Outback Steakhouse Pro-Am in Lutz, Florida:
Winner: John Cook  204 (−9)PO
Cook defeats Jay Don Blake  on the first playoff hole and wins his second Champions Tour title of the season and seventh overall.

Ice hockey
Women's World Championship in Switzerland:
Group A:
 5–0 
 7–1 
Group B:
 0–7 
 1–2 (OT) 
Standings (after 2 games): Canada 6 points, Finland 4, Switzerland 2, Kazakhstan 0.
World U18 Championships in Germany:
Group A:
 2–3 
 4–3 
Standings: United States 9 points (3 games), Russia 5 (3),  4 (2), Switzerland 3 (3), Slovakia 0 (3).
Group B:
 2–3 
 5–2 
Standings:  6 points (2 games), Czech Republic, Sweden 6 (3), Finland 3 (3), Norway 0 (3).
Stanley Cup playoffs (all series best-of-7; seeds in parentheses):
Eastern Conference Quarterfinals:
Game 3 in New York: (8) New York Rangers 3, (1) Washington Capitals 2. Capitals lead series 2–1.
Western Conference Quarterfinals:
Game 3 in Nashville: (4) (5) Nashville Predators 4, Anaheim Ducks 3. Predators lead series 2–1.
Game 3 in Chicago: (1) Vancouver Canucks 3, (8) Chicago Blackhawks 2. Canucks lead series 3–0.

Motorcycle racing
Superbike:
Assen World Championship round in Assen, Netherlands:
Race 1: (1) Jonathan Rea  (Honda CBR1000RR) (2) Max Biaggi  (Aprilia RSV4) (3) Carlos Checa  (Ducati 1198)
Race 2: (1) Checa (2) Biaggi (3) Rea
Riders' championship standings (after 3 of 13 rounds): (1) Checa 132 points (2) Biaggi 89 (3) Marco Melandri  (Yamaha YZF-R1) 85
Supersport:
Assen World Championship round in Assen, Netherlands: (1) Chaz Davies  (Yamaha YZF-R6) (2) Fabien Foret  (Honda CBR600RR) (3) Broc Parkes  (Kawasaki Ninja ZX-6R)
Riders' championship standings (after 3 of 12 rounds): (1) Luca Scassa  (Yamaha YZF-R6) 50 points (2) Parkes 47 (3) Davies 45

Snooker
World Championship in Sheffield, England, last 32:
Jamie Cope  10–7 Andrew Pagett 
Shaun Murphy  10–1 Marcus Campbell 
Ali Carter  10–3 Dave Harold 
Mark Williams  10–5 Ryan Day 
Ding Junhui  8–1 Jamie Burnett 
Stephen Hendry  6–3 Joe Perry

Tennis
Fed Cup World Group Semifinals, day 2:
 5–0 
Vera Zvonareva  def. Roberta Vinci  6–4, 6–2
Anastasia Pavlyuchenkova  def. Sara Errani  7–6(5), 7–6(4)
Pavlyuchenkova/Ekaterina Makarova  def. Alberta Brianti/Maria Elena Camerin  7–6(3), 6–1
 2–3 
Petra Kvitová  def. Yanina Wickmayer  5–7, 6–4, 6–2
Kirsten Flipkens  def. Barbora Záhlavová-Strýcová  6–2, 6–3
Iveta Benešová/Záhlavová-Strýcová  def. Flipkens/Wickmayer  6–4, 6–4
ATP World Tour:
Monte-Carlo Rolex Masters in Roquebrune-Cap-Martin, France:
Final: Rafael Nadal  def. David Ferrer  6–4, 7–5
Nadal wins the event for the seventh successive year, and his 19th Masters 1000 title and 44th title overall.

Weightlifting
European Championships in Kazan, Russia:
Women +75 kg:
Snatch:  Tatiana Kashirina  146 kg (WR)  Hripsime Khurshudyan  114 kg  Ümmühan Uçar  113 kg
Clean & Jerk:  Kashirina 181 kg  Khurshudyan 140 kg  Uçar 136 kg
Total:   Kashirina 327 kg (WR)  Khurshudyan 254 kg  Uçar 249 kg
Kashirina wins the title for the third successive time.
Men +105 kg:
Snatch:  Ihor Shimechko  195 kg  Dmitry Lapikov  192 kg  Irakli Turmanidze  188 kg
Clean & Jerk:  Lapikov 227 kg  Jiří Orság  226 kg  Bünyamin Sudaş  224 kg
Total:  Lapikov 419 kg  Shimechko 412 kg  Orság 410 kg

April 16, 2011 (Saturday)

Auto racing
World Rally Championship:
Jordan Rally in Amman, Jordan: (1) Sébastien Ogier /Julien Ingrassia  (Citroën DS3 WRC) (2) Jari-Matti Latvala /Miikka Anttila  (Ford Fiesta RS WRC) (3) Sébastien Loeb /Daniel Elena  (Citroën DS3 WRC)
Ogier wins the event by 0.2 seconds, the smallest margin in WRC history.
Drivers' championship standings (after 4 of 13 rallies): (1) Loeb 74 points (2) Mikko Hirvonen  (Ford Fiesta RS WRC) 72 (3) Ogier 69
V8 Supercars:
ITM Hamilton 400 in Hamilton, New Zealand:
Race 5: (1) Rick Kelly  (Kelly Racing, Holden VE Commodore) (2) Craig Lowndes  (Triple Eight Race Engineering, Holden VE Commodore) (3) Todd Kelly  (Kelly Racing, Holden VE Commodore)
Drivers' championship standings (after 5 of 27 races): (1) Jamie Whincup  (Triple Eight Race Engineering, Holden VE Commodore) 603 points (2) Mark Winterbottom  (Ford Performance Racing, Ford FG Falcon) 543 (3) Lowndes 474
Nationwide Series:
Aaron's 312 in Talladega, Alabama: (1)  Kyle Busch (Toyota; Joe Gibbs Racing) (2)  Joey Logano (Toyota; Joe Gibbs Racing) (3)  Joe Nemechek (Chevrolet; NEMCO Motorsports)
Drivers' championship standings (after 7 of 34 races): (1)  Jason Leffler (Chevrolet; Turner Motorsports) 233 points (2)  Justin Allgaier (Chevrolet; Turner Motorsports) 231 (3)  Elliott Sadler (Chevrolet; Kevin Harvick Incorporated) 228

Basketball
EuroCup Final Four in Treviso, Italy:
Semifinals:
UNICS Kazan  87–66  Cedevita Zagreb
Cajasol  75–63  Benetton Basket Bwin
NBA Playoffs (all series best-of-7; seeds in parentheses):
Eastern Conference First round:
Game 1 in Chicago: (1) Chicago Bulls 104, (8) Indiana Pacers 99. Bulls lead series 1–0.
Game 1 in Miami: (2) Miami Heat 97, (7) Philadelphia 76ers 89. Heat lead series 1–0.
Game 1 in Orlando: (5) Atlanta Hawks 103, (4) Orlando Magic 93. Hawks lead series 1–0.
Western Conference First round:
Game 1 in Dallas: (3) Dallas Mavericks 89, (6) Portland Trail Blazers 81. Mavericks lead series 1–0.

Football (soccer)
UEFA Women's Champions League Semi-finals, second leg: (first leg score in parentheses)
Arsenal  2–3 (0–2)  Lyon. Lyon win 5–2 on aggregate.

Ice hockey
Women's World Championship in Switzerland:
Group B:
 5–3 
 12–0 
World U18 Championships in Germany:
Group A:  4–5 (SO) 
Standings (after 2 games):  6 points, Russia 5, Germany 4,  0.
Group B:  5–4 
Standings (after 2 games): Canada 6 points, Finland,  3,  0.
Stanley Cup playoffs (all series best-of-7; seeds in parentheses):
Eastern Conference Quarterfinals:
Game 2 in Philadelphia: (2) Philadelphia Flyers 5, (7) Buffalo Sabres 4. Series tied 1–1.
Game 2 in Boston: (6) Montreal Canadiens 3, (3) Boston Bruins 1. Canadiens lead series 2–0.
Western Conference Quarterfinals:
Game 2 in San Jose: (7) Los Angeles Kings 4, (2) San Jose Sharks 0. Series tied 1–1.
Game 2 in Detroit: (3) Detroit Red Wings 4, (6) Phoenix Coyotes 3. Red Wings lead series 2–0.
Gagarin Cup Finals (best-of-7 series):
Game 5 in Ufa: (3) Salavat Yulaev Ufa 3, (4) Atlant Moscow Oblast 2. Salavat Yulaev win series 4–1.
Salavat Yulaev win the Cup for the first time.

Snooker
World Championship in Sheffield, England, last 32:
Neil Robertson  8–10 Judd Trump 
Robertson falls to the Crucible curse, as he becomes another first-time champion to not defend his title.
Jamie Cope  5–4 Andrew Pagett 
Ali Carter  8–1 Dave Harold 
Mark Williams  6–3 Ryan Day 
Shaun Murphy  9–0 Marcus Campbell

Tennis
Fed Cup World Group Semifinals, day 1:
 2–0 
Vera Zvonareva  def. Sara Errani  6–0, 6–2
Svetlana Kuznetsova  def. Roberta Vinci  6–2, 6–7(4), 6–1
 1–1 
Petra Kvitová  def. Kirsten Flipkens  6–2, 7–6(4)
Yanina Wickmayer  def. Barbora Záhlavová-Strýcová  6–4, 6–4

Weightlifting
European Championships in Kazan, Russia:
Men 94 kg:
Snatch:  Aurimas Didzbalis  177 kg  Anatoli Ciricu  173 kg  Gevorik Pogosyan  173 kg
Clean & Jerk:  Andrey Demanov  220 kg  Ciricu 217 kg  Pogosyan 216 kg
Total:  Demanov 391 kg  Ciricu 390 kg  Pogosyan 389 kg
Women 75 kg:
Snatch:  Natalya Zabolotnaya  133 kg  Nadezhda Yevstyukhina  130 kg  Lydia Valentín  122 kg
Clean & Jerk:  Yevstyukhina 162 kg  Zabolotnaya 153 kg  Valentín 142 kg
Total:  Yevstyukhina 292 kg  Zabolotnaya 286 kg  Valentín 264 kg
Men 105 kg:
Snatch:  Akkaev Khadzhimurat  195 kg  Machavariani Gia  183 kg  Audzeyeu Mikhail  181 kg
Clean & Jerk:  Khadzhimurat 230 kg  Gia 217 kg  Bonk Bartlomiej  214 kg
Total:  Khadzhimurat 425 kg  Gia 400 kg  Bartlomiej 394 kg

April 15, 2011 (Friday)

Football (soccer)
AFC Cup group stage, matchday 4:
Group B: Al-Saqr  2–2  Al-Qadsia
Standings: Al-Qadsia 10 points (4 matches),  Shurtan Guzar,  Al-Ittihad 4 (3), Al-Saqr 1 (4).

Ice hockey
World U18 Championships in Germany:
Group A:
 1–8 
 1–4 
Standings: United States 6 points (2 games), Germany 3 (1), Switzerland, Slovakia 0 (2).
Group B:
 2–10 
 0–5 
Standings: Sweden 3 points (2 games), Canada,  3 (1), Czech Republic 3 (2), Norway 0 (2).
Stanley Cup playoffs (all series best-of-7; seeds in parentheses):
Eastern Conference Quarterfinals:
Game 2 in Washington: (1) Washington Capitals 2, (8) New York Rangers 0. Capitals lead series 2–0.
Game 2 in Pittsburgh: (5) Tampa Bay Lightning 5, (4) Pittsburgh Penguins 1. Series tied 1–1.
Western Conference Quarterfinals:
Game 2 in Vancouver: (1) Vancouver Canucks 4, (8) Chicago Blackhawks 3. Canucks lead series 2–0.
Game 2 in Anaheim: (4) Anaheim Ducks 5, (5) Nashville Predators 3. Series tied 1–1.

Weightlifting
European Championships in Kazan, Russia:
Women 69 kg:
Snatch:  Oxana Slivenko  120 kg  Tatiana Matveeva  110 kg  Eszter Krutzler  104 kg
Clean & Jerk:  Slivenko 145 kg  Matveeva 141 kg  Krutzler 127 kg
Total:  Slivenko 265 kg  Matveeva 251 kg  Krutzler 231 kg
Slivenko wins her second European title.
Men 85 kg:
Snatch:  Apti Aukhadov  173 kg  Aleksey Yufkin  170 kg  Anatoly Moshik  165 kg
Clean & Jerk:  Yufkin 215 kg  Aukhadov 212 kg  Benjamin Hennequin  208 kg
Total:  Yufkin 385 kg  Aukhadov 385 kg  Hennequin 373 kg
Yufkin wins his second European title.

April 14, 2011 (Thursday)

Darts
Premier League, week 10 in Sheffield, England (player in bold qualifies for the playoffs):
James Wade  8–5 Simon Whitlock 
Mark Webster  1–8 Gary Anderson 
Terry Jenkins  2–8 Phil Taylor 
Raymond van Barneveld  8–3 Adrian Lewis 
Standings (after 10 matches): Taylor 18 points, Anderson 14, van Barneveld 12, Whitlock 10, Lewis 9, Wade 8, Jenkins 5, Webster 4.

Football (soccer)
UEFA Europa League Quarter-finals, second leg: (first leg score in parentheses)
Spartak Moscow  2–5 (1–5)  Porto. Porto win 10–3 on aggregate.
PSV Eindhoven  2–2 (1–4)  Benfica. Benfica win 6–3 on aggregate.
Twente  1–3 (1–5)  Villarreal. Villarreal win 8–2 on aggregate.
Braga  0–0 (1–1)  Dynamo Kyiv. 1–1 on aggregate; Braga win on away goals.
Copa Libertadores second stage (teams in bold advance to the knockout stage):
Group 2:
Oriente Petrolero  3–0  Grêmio
Junior  1–1  León de Huánuco
Final standings: Junior 13 points, Grêmio 10, Oriente Petrolero 6, León de Huánuco 5.
Group 4:
Universidad Católica  2–1  Unión Española
Caracas  0–3   Vélez Sársfield
Final standings: Universidad Católica 11 points, Vélez Sársfield 10, Caracas 9, Unión Española 4.
Group 5: Cerro Porteño  1–2  Santos
Standings (after 5 matches):  Colo-Colo 9 points, Cerro Porteño, Santos 8,  Deportivo Táchira 2.

Ice hockey
World U18 Championships in Germany:
Group A:
 8–2 
 1–2 
Group B:
 5–2 
 2–1 
Stanley Cup playoffs (all series best-of-7; seeds in parentheses):
Eastern Conference Quarterfinals:
Game 1 in Philadelphia: (7) Buffalo Sabres 1, (2) Philadelphia Flyers 0. Sabres lead series 1–0.
Game 1 in Boston: (6) Montreal Canadiens 2, (3) Boston Bruins 0. Canadiens lead series 1–0.
Western Conference Quarterfinals:
Game 1 in San Jose: (2) San Jose Sharks 3, (7) Los Angeles Kings 2 (OT). Sharks lead series 1–0.

Snooker
Scottish Professional Championship at Clydebank, Scotland:
Final: John Higgins  6–1 Anthony McGill 
Higgins wins the 37th title of his career and fifth of the season.

Weightlifting
European Championships in Kazan, Russia:
Women 63 kg:
Snatch:  Svetlana Tsarukaeva  112 kg  Sibel Şimşek  108 kg  Marina Shainova  104 kg
Clean & Jerk:  Shainova 141 kg  Tsarukaeva 133 kg  Şimşek 130 kg
Total:  Shainova 245 kg  Tsarukaeva 245 kg  Şimşek 238 kg
Shainova wins the title for the fourth time.
Men 77 kg:
Snatch:  Arayik Mirzoyan  160 kg  Erkand Qerimaj  157 kg  Semih Yağci  155 kg
Clean & Jerk:  Yagci 192 kg  Mirzoyan 187 kg  Alexandru Rosu  185 kg
Total:  Yagci 347 kg  Mirzoyan 347 kg  Rosu 340 kg

April 13, 2011 (Wednesday)

Baseball
Barry Bonds, the all-time career home run leader in Major League Baseball, is convicted in U.S. federal court of obstruction of justice related to his actions during the investigation of the BALCO steroids case. The jury fails to reach a verdict on three perjury counts.

Cricket
Australia in Bangladesh:
3rd ODI in Mirpur:  361/8 (50 overs; Michael Hussey 108);  295/6 (50 overs). Australia win by 66 runs; win 3-match series 3–0.

Football (soccer)
UEFA Champions League Quarter-finals, second leg (first leg score in parentheses):
Schalke 04  2–1 (5–2)  Internazionale. Schalke 04 win 7–3 on aggregate.
Tottenham Hotspur  0–1 (0–4)  Real Madrid. Real Madrid win 5–0 on aggregate.
Copa Libertadores second stage (teams in bold advance to the knockout stage):
Group 7:
Guaraní  0–2  Deportes Tolima
Estudiantes  0–3  Cruzeiro
Final standings: Cruzeiro 16 points, Estudiantes 10, Deportes Tolima 8, Guaraní 0.
AFC Champions League group stage:
Group H: Sydney FC  0–3  Kashima Antlers
Standings (after 3 matches):  Suwon Samsung Bluewings, Kashima Antlers 5 points, Sydney FC,  Shanghai Shenhua 2.
AFC Cup group stage, matchday 3:
Group B: Shurtan Guzar  1–1  Al-Ittihad
Standings (after 3 matches):  Al-Qadsia 9 points, Shurtan Guzar, Al-Ittihad 4,  Al-Saqr 0.
Group D:
Al-Suwaiq  1–2  Al-Talaba
Al-Kuwait  1–3  Al-Wehdat
Standings (after 3 matches): Al-Wehdat 9 points, Al-Kuwait 6, Al-Talaba 3, Al-Suwaiq 0.
Group F:
Sriwijaya  3–1  Sông Lam Nghệ An
VB  3–5  TSW Pegasus
Standings (after 3 matches): Sriwijaya 7 points, TSW Pegasus 6, Sông Lam Nghệ An 3, VB 1.
Group H:
Persipura Jayapura  3–0  Chonburi
South China  1–0  Kingfisher East Bengal
Standings (after 3 matches): Persipura Jayapura 7 points, Chonburi, South China 4, Kingfisher East Bengal 1.

Ice hockey
Stanley Cup playoffs (all series best-of-7; seeds in parentheses):
Eastern Conference quarterfinals:
Game 1 in Pittsburgh: (4) Pittsburgh Penguins 3, (5) Tampa Bay Lightning 0. Penguins lead series 1–0.
Game 1 in Washington: (1) Washington Capitals 2, (8) New York Rangers 1 (OT). Capitals lead series 1–0.
Western Conference quarterfinals:
Game 1 in Detroit: (3) Detroit Red Wings 4, (6) Phoenix Coyotes 2. Red Wings lead series 1–0.
Game 1 in Vancouver: (1) Vancouver Canucks 2, (8) Chicago Blackhawks 0. Canucks lead series 1–0.
Game 1 in Anaheim: (5) Nashville Predators 4, (4) Anaheim Ducks 1. Predators lead series 1–0.

Weightlifting
European Championships in Kazan, Russia:
Women 58 kg:
Snatch:  Nastassia Novikava  100 kg  Iuliia Paratova  92 kg  Yuliya Derkach  88 kg
Clean & Jerk:  Novikava 125 kg  Alexandra Klejnowska  110 kg  Paratova 108 kg
Total:  Novikava 225 kg  Paratova 200 kg  Klejnowska 196 kg
Novikava wins her third successive title and fourth overall.
Men 69 kg:
Snatch:  Mete Binay  154 kg  Răzvan Constantin Martin  150 kg Vladislav Lukanin  146 kg
Clean & Jerk:  Lukanin 186 kg  Martin 181 kg  Daniel Godelli  176 kg
Total:  Lukanin 332 kg  Martin 331 kg  Godelli 321 kg

April 12, 2011 (Tuesday)

Baseball
Nippon Professional Baseball season opening games:
Pacific League:
Fukuoka SoftBank Hawks 2, Orix Buffaloes 2 (12 innings)
Saitama Seibu Lions 12, Hokkaido Nippon-Ham Fighters 3
Tohoku Rakuten Golden Eagles 6, Chiba Lotte Marines 4
Central League:
Yokohama BayStars 5, Chunichi Dragons 4
Hanshin Tigers 7, Hiroshima Toyo Carp 4
Yomiuri Giants 9, Tokyo Yakult Swallows 2

Football (soccer)
UEFA Champions League Quarter-finals, second leg: (first leg score in parentheses)
Shakhtar Donetsk  0–1 (1–5)  Barcelona. Barcelona win 6–1 on aggregate.
Manchester United  2–1 (1–0)  Chelsea. Manchester United win 3–1 on aggregate.
Copa Libertadores second stage (teams in bold advance to the knockout stage):
Group 5: Colo-Colo  2–1  Deportivo Táchira
Standings: Colo-Colo 9 points (5 matches),  Cerro Porteño 8 (4),  Santos 5 (4), Deportivo Táchira 2 (5).
Group 8:
Peñarol  0–1  Independiente
LDU Quito  2–0  Godoy Cruz
Final standings: LDU Quito 10 points, Peñarol 9, Independiente 8, Godoy Cruz 7.
AFC Champions League group stage:
Group F: Nagoya Grampus  4–0  Al-Ain
Standings (after 3 matches):  FC Seoul 7 points, Nagoya Grampus,  Hangzhou Greentown 4, Al-Ain 1.
AFC Cup group stage, matchday 3:
Group A:
Al-Tilal  1–4  Al-Ansar
Dempo  0–4  Nasaf Qarshi
Standings (after 3 matches): Nasaf Qarshi 9 points, Al-Ansar 6, Dempo 3, Al-Tilal 0.
Group B: Al-Qadsia  3–0  Al-Saqr
Standings: Al-Qadsia 9 points (3 matches),  Shurtan Guzar,  Al-Ittihad 3 (2), Al-Saqr 0 (3).
Group C:
Al-Faisaly  2–1  Al-Nasr
Al-Jaish  0–0  Duhok
Standings (after 3 matches): Duhok 7 points, Al-Faisaly 6, Al-Jaish 4, Al-Nasr 0.
Group E:
Al Ahed  4–1  Al-Karamah
Arbil  0–0  Al-Oruba
Standings (after 3 matches): Al-Oruba, Arbil 5 points, Al Ahed 3, Al-Karamah 2.
Group G:
Hà Nội T&T  1–1  Tampines Rovers
Muangthong United  1–0  Victory
Standings (after 3 matches): Muangthong United 7 points, Tampines Rovers 5, Hà Nội T&T 4, Victory 0.

Golf
The South Africa-based Sunshine Tour announces that starting in 2012, it will host a new World Golf Championships tournament. The event, to be known as the Tournament of Hope, is planned to launch with a purse of US$10 million, the richest in golf.

Weightlifting
European Championships in Kazan, Russia:
Women 53 kg:
Snatch:  Aylin Daşdelen  90 kg  Elen Grygorian  85 kg  Julia Rohde  83 kg
Clean & Jerk:  Daşdelen 112 kg  Grygorian 110 kg  Ayşegül Çoban  105 kg
Total:  Daşdelen 202 kg  Grygorian 195 kg  Rohde 187 kg
Daşdelen wins her second successive title and fourth overall.
Men 62 kg:
Snatch:  Bünyamin Sezer  140 kg  Antoniu Buci  134 kg  Damian Wiśniewski  130 kg
Clean & Jerk:  Marius Gîscan  162 kg  Hurşit Atak  161 kg  Sezer 158 kg
Total:  Sezer 298 kg  Buci 290 kg  Atak 289 kg

April 11, 2011 (Monday)

Cricket
Australia in Bangladesh:
2nd ODI in Mirpur:  229/7 (50 overs);  232/1 (26 overs; Shane Watson 185*). Australia win by 9 wickets; lead 3-match series 2–0.
Watson records the highest One Day International score by an Australian, and also sets a new record for most sixes in an ODI innings with 15.

Weightlifting
European Championships in Kazan, Russia:
Women 48 kg:
Snatch:  Nurcan Taylan  90 kg  Genny Pagliaro  82 kg  Nurdan Karagöz  80 kg
Clean & Jerk:  Taylan 105 kg  Karagöz 100 kg  Pagliaro 98 kg
Total:  Taylan 195 kg  Karagöz 180 kg  Pagliaro 180 kg
Taylan wins her fourth successive European title and sixth overall.
Men 56 kg:
Snatch:  Gökhan Kılıç  118 kg  Stanislau Chadovich  118 kg  Ghenadie Dudoglo  115 kg
Clean & Jerk:  Oleg Sîrghi  150 kg  Florin Ionuț Croitoru  141 kg  Smbat Margaryan  141 kg
Total:  Sîrghi 262 kg  Kılıç 256 kg  Croitoru 256 kg

April 10, 2011 (Sunday)

Auto racing
Formula One:
 in Sepang, Malaysia: (1) Sebastian Vettel  (Red Bull–Renault) (2) Jenson Button  (McLaren–Mercedes) (3) Nick Heidfeld  (Renault)
Drivers' championship standings (after 2 of 19 races): (1) Vettel 50 points (2) Button 26 (3) Lewis Hamilton  (McLaren-Mercedes) & Mark Webber  (Red Bull-Renault) 22
IndyCar Series:
Honda Indy Grand Prix of Alabama presented by Legacy Credit Union in Birmingham, Alabama: (1) Will Power  (Team Penske) (2) Scott Dixon  (Chip Ganassi Racing) (3) Dario Franchitti  (Chip Ganassi Racing)
Drivers' championship standings (after 2 of 17 races): (1) Power 94 points (2) Franchitti 87 (3) Tony Kanaan  (KV Racing Technology – Lotus) 63

Basketball
EuroLeague Women Final Four in Yekaterinburg, Russia:
Third place game: Ros Casares Valencia  52–64   UMMC Ekaterinburg
Final:  Spartak Moscow Region  59–68   Halcon Avenida Salamanca
Halcon Avenida Salamanca avenge their 2009 final defeat by Spartak Moscow Region, ending Spartak's run of four consecutive titles, and winning their first title.

Curling
World Men's Championship in Regina, Saskatchewan, Canada:
Bronze medal game:  6–7  
Gold medal game:   6–5  
Canada win the world title for the second successive year and the 33rd time overall. Canadian skip Jeff Stoughton wins his second world title, fifteen years after winning his first, also against Scotland.

Cycling
UCI World Tour:
Paris–Roubaix:  Johan Vansummeren  6h 07' 28"  Fabian Cancellara  + 19"  Maarten Tjallingii  + 19"
World Tour standings (after 9 of 27 races): (1) Cancellara 236 points (2) Matthew Goss  203 (3) Andreas Klöden  & Michele Scarponi  202

Football (soccer)
CONCACAF Under-20 Championship in Guatemala City, Guatemala:
Third place match (winner qualifies for the Pan American Games):   0–0 (7–6 pen.) 
Final:   1–3  
 First Division, matchday 28 (team in bold qualifies for the UEFA Champions League, team in italics qualifies for the UEFA Europa League):
APOEL 2–0 Omonia
Anorthosis 2–0 AEK
Standings: APOEL 68 points, Omonia 55, Anorthosis 48, AEK 42.
APOEL win the title for a record 21st time.
 National Division, matchday 21 (team in bold qualify for the UEFA Champions League):
Progrès Niedercorn 2–1 UN Käerjéng
RM Hamm Benfica 2–0 Differdange 03
Standings: F91 Dudelange 52 points, UN Käerjéng 36, Differdange 03, Fola Esch, Progrès Niedercorn 34.
F91 Dudelange win the title for the ninth time in twelve seasons.

Golf
Men's majors:
Masters Tournament in Augusta, Georgia, United States: (1) Charl Schwartzel  274 (−14) (T2) Jason Day  & Adam Scott  276 (−12)
Schwartzel joins Trevor Immelman and Gary Player and becomes the third South African to win the Masters, and the seventh South African to win a major.

Gymnastics
European Artistic Gymnastics Championships in Berlin, Germany:
Men:
Vault:  Thomas Bouhail  16.362 points  Samir Aït Saïd  16.262  Anton Golotsutskov  16.125
Bouhail wins his second European vault title.
Parallel bars:  Marcel Nguyen  15.525 points  Epke Zonderland  15.300  Vasileios Tsolakidis  15.075
Horizontal bar:  Epke Zonderland  15.575 points  Philipp Boy  15.350  Marcel Nguyen  15.300
Women:
Balance beam:  Anna Dementyeva  15.350 points  Carlotta Ferlito  14.500  Elisabetta Preziosa  14.325
Dementyeva wins her second title of the championships.
Floor:  Sandra Izbaşa  14.500 points  Diana Chelaru  14.475  Yulia Belokobylskaya  14.450
Izbaşa wins her second title of the championships, third title on floor and fifth overall.

Rugby union
Heineken Cup quarter-finals:
Northampton Saints  23–13  Ulster in Milton Keynes
Biarritz  20–27 (a.e.t.)  Toulouse in San Sebastián

Tennis
ATP World Tour:
Grand Prix Hassan III in Casablanca, Morocco:
Final: Pablo Andújar  def. Potito Starace  6–1, 6–2
Andújar wins his first ATP Tour title.
US Men's Clay Court Championships in Houston, Texas, United States:
Final: Ryan Sweeting  def. Kei Nishikori  6–4, 7–6(3)
Sweeting wins his first ATP Tour title.
WTA Tour:
Family Circle Cup in Charleston, South Carolina, United States:
Final: Caroline Wozniacki  def. Elena Vesnina  6–2, 6–3
Wozniacki wins her third title of the year and 15th of her career.
Andalucia Tennis Experience in Marbella, Spain:
Final: Victoria Azarenka  def. Irina-Camelia Begu  6–3, 6–2
Azarenka wins her second title in as many weeks, and the seventh of her career.

Triathlon
ITU World Championships, Leg 1 in Sydney, Australia:
Men:  Javier Gómez  1:50:22  Jonathan Brownlee  1:50:29  Sven Riederer  1:50:34
Women:  Paula Findlay  2:01:21  Barbara Riveros Diaz  2:01:24  Andrea Hewitt  2:01:29

April 9, 2011 (Saturday)

Auto racing
Sprint Cup Series:
Samsung Mobile 500 in Fort Worth, Texas: (1)  Matt Kenseth (Ford; Roush Fenway Racing) (2)  Clint Bowyer (Chevrolet; Richard Childress Racing) (3)  Carl Edwards (Ford; Roush Fenway Racing)
Drivers' championship standings (after 7 of 36 races): (1) Edwards 256 points (2)  Kyle Busch (Toyota; Joe Gibbs Racing) 247 (3) Kenseth &  Jimmie Johnson (Chevrolet; Hendrick Motorsports) 243

Cricket
Australia in Bangladesh:
1st ODI in Mirpur:  270/7 (50 overs; Michael Clarke 101);  210/5 (50 overs). Australia win by 60 runs; lead 3-match series 1–0.

Curling
World Men's Championship in Regina, Saskatchewan, Canada:
Page playoffs 3 vs. 4:  2–7 
Semifinal:  7–6

Cycling
UCI World Tour:
Tour of the Basque Country, Stage 6:  Tony Martin  32' 16"  Andreas Klöden   + 9"  Marco Pinotti  + 24"
Final general classification: (1) Klöden   22h 12' 11 (2) Chris Horner  + 47" (3) Robert Gesink  + 47"
World Tour standings (after 8 of 27 races): (1) Matthew Goss  203 points (2) Klöden & Michele Scarponi  202

Football (soccer)
South American Under-17 Championship in Quito, Ecuador: (teams in bold qualify for the FIFA U-17 World Cup and Pan American Games)
Final stage:
 1–2 
 1–1 
 2–3 
Final standings: Brazil 13 points, Uruguay 9, Argentina 7, Ecuador 6, Colombia 4, Paraguay 1.
Brazil win the title for the fourth successive time and tenth overall.
UEFA Women's Champions League Semi-finals, first leg:
Duisburg  2–2  Turbine Potsdam
Lyon  2–0  Arsenal

Golf
Men's majors:
Masters Tournament in Augusta, Georgia, United States:
Leaderboard after third round: (1) Rory McIlroy  204 (−12) (T2) Jason Day , K. J. Choi , Ángel Cabrera  & Charl Schwartzel  208 (−8)

Gymnastics
European Artistic Gymnastics Championships in Berlin, Germany:
Men:
Floor:  Flavius Koczi  15.500  Alexander Shatilov  15.400  Anton Golotsutskov  15.325
Koczi wins his second European title.
Pommel horse:  Krisztián Berki  15.625  Cyril Tommasone  15.050  Harutyum Merdinyan  14.950
Berki wins his fifth European pommel horse title.
Rings:  Konstantin Pluzhnikov  15.850  Aleksandr Balandin  15.775  Eleftherios Petrounias  15.675
Women:
Vault:  Sandra Izbaşa  14.675  Oksana Chusovitina  14.537  Ariella Kaeslin  14.475
Izbaşa wins her fourth European title.
Uneven bars:  Beth Tweddle  15.100  Tatiana Nabieva  15.075  Kim Bui  14.675
Tweddle wins her fourth European title on uneven bars and sixth title overall.

Horse racing
Grand National in Aintree, England:  Ballabriggs (trainer: Donald McCain Jr.; jockey: Jason Maguire)  Oscar Time (trainer: Martin Lynch; jockey: Sam Waley-Cohen)  Don't Push It (trainer: Jonjo O'Neill; jockey: Tony McCoy)

Ice hockey
NCAA Men's Frozen Four in St. Paul, Minnesota:
Championship Game: Minnesota–Duluth 3, Michigan 2 (OT)
The Bulldogs win their first national title.

Mixed martial arts
Strikeforce: Diaz vs. Daley in San Diego, California, United States:
Welterweight Championship bout: Nick Diaz  (c) def. Paul Daley  via TKO (punches)
Lightweight Championship bout: Gilbert Melendez  (c) def. Tatsuya Kawajiri  via TKO (strikes)
Light Heavyweight bout: Gegard Mousasi  and Keith Jardine  fought to a majority draw (29–27, 28–28, 28–28)
Lightweight bout: Shinya Aoki  def. Lyle Beerbohm  via submission (neck crank)

Rugby union
Heineken Cup quarter-finals:
Leinster  17–10  Leicester Tigers in Dublin
Perpignan  29–25  Toulon in Barcelona
Amlin Challenge Cup quarter-finals:
Brive  37–42  Munster

Synchronized skating
World Championships in Helsinki, Finland:
Final standings:  Rockettes  215.43  Marigold IceUnity  213.48  Haydenettes  205.40
Rockettes win the title for the second successive time and third time in four years.
Finland win the title for the sixth time.

April 8, 2011 (Friday)

Auto racing
Nationwide Series:
O'Reilly 300 in Fort Worth, Texas: (1)  Carl Edwards (Ford; Roush Fenway Racing) (2)  Brad Keselowski (Dodge; Penske Racing) (3)  Paul Menard (Chevrolet; Kevin Harvick Incorporated)
Drivers' championship standings (after 6 of 34 races): (1)  Ricky Stenhouse Jr. (Ford; Roush Fenway Racing) 218 points (2)  Jason Leffler (Chevrolet; Turner Motorsports) 204 (3)  Justin Allgaier (Chevrolet; Turner Motorsports) 194

Basketball
EuroLeague Women Final Four in Yekaterinburg, Russia:
Semifinals:
Spartak Moscow Region  54–43  UMMC Ekaterinburg
Ros Casares Valencia  49–61  Halcon Avenida Salamanca

Curling
World Men's Championship in Regina, Saskatchewan, Canada:
Tiebreaker:  4–5 
Page playoffs 1 vs. 2:  5–2

Cycling
UCI World Tour:
Tour of the Basque Country, Stage 5:  Francesco Gavazzi  4h 27' 03"  Kristof Vandewalle  s.t.  John Gadret  s.t.
General classification (after stage 5): (1) Joaquim Rodríguez   21h 39' 46" (2) Andreas Klöden   + 0" (3) Samuel Sánchez  + 0"

Football (soccer)
CONCACAF Under-20 Championship in Guatemala City, Guatemala:
Semifinals: (winners qualify for the Pan American Games)
 4–1 
 2–1

Golf
Men's majors:
Masters Tournament in Augusta, Georgia, United States:
Leaderboard after second round: (1) Rory McIlroy  134 (−10) (2) Jason Day  136 (−8) (T3) K. J. Choi  & Tiger Woods  137 (−7)
Day shoots a 64, the lowest score ever by a Masters rookie.

Gymnastics
European Artistic Gymnastics Championships in Berlin, Germany:
Men's Individual all-around:  Philipp Boy  88.875 points  Flavius Koczi  88.825  Daniel Purvis  & Mykola Kuksenkov  88.350
Women's Individual all-around:  Anna Dementyeva  57.475 points  Elisabeth Seitz  56.700  Amelia Racea  56.600

Rugby union
Amlin Challenge Cup quarter-finals:
Stade Français  32–28  Montpellier
Harlequins  32–22  London Wasps

Synchronized skating
World Championships in Helsinki, Finland:
Short program: (1) Rockettes  74.81 (2) Marigold IceUnity  73.54 (3) Haydenettes  71.16

April 7, 2011 (Thursday)

Basketball
Euroleague Quarterfinals: (best-of-5 series)
Game 5: Real Madrid  66–58  Power Electronics Valencia. Real Madrid win series 3–2.

Curling
World Men's Championship in Regina, Saskatchewan, Canada (teams in bold advance to the playoffs, teams in italics advance to a tiebreaker game):
Draw 15:
 6–1 
 5–4 
 4–8 
 7–3 
Draw 16:
 9–8 
 7–4 
 1–3 
 7–6 
Draw 17:
 6–7 
 5–6 
 7–9 
 7–6 
Final standings: Canada 10–1; Scotland 9–2; Sweden, France, Norway 7–4; Germany, Switzerland 6–5; Czech Republic 5–6; China 4–7; United States 3–8; South Korea 2–9; Denmark 0–11.

Cycling
UCI World Tour:
Tour of the Basque Country, Stage 4:  Samuel Sánchez  4h 42' 34"  Andreas Klöden  s.t.  Alexander Vinokourov  s.t.
General classification (after stage 4): (1) Joaquim Rodríguez   17h 12' 43" (2) Klöden  + 0" (3) Sánchez + 0"

Darts
Premier League, week 9 in Aberdeen, Scotland:
Gary Anderson  8–3 Terry Jenkins 
Adrian Lewis  3–8 James Wade 
Mark Webster  1–8 Phil Taylor 
Raymond van Barneveld  5–8 Simon Whitlock 
Standings (after 9 matches): Taylor 16 points, Anderson 12, Whitlock, van Barneveld 10, Lewis 9, Wade 6, Jenkins 5, Webster 4.

Football (soccer)
UEFA Europa League Quarter-finals, first leg:
Porto  5–1  Spartak Moscow
Benfica  4–1  PSV Eindhoven
Villarreal  5–1  Twente
Dynamo Kyiv  1–1  Braga
Copa Libertadores second stage (teams in bold advance to the knockout stage):
Group 2: Grêmio  2–0  Junior
Standings (after 5 matches): Junior 12 points, Grêmio 10,  León de Huánuco 4,  Oriente Petrolero 3.
Group 4: Universidad Católica  0–0  Vélez Sársfield
Standings (after 5 matches):  Caracas 9 points, Universidad Católica 8, Vélez Sársfield 7,  Unión Española 4.
Group 6: Jorge Wilstermann  0–0  Emelec
Standings (after 5 matches):  Internacional 10 points,  Chiapas 9, Emelec 8, Jorge Wilstermann 1.

Golf
Men's majors:
Masters Tournament in Augusta, Georgia, United States:
Leaderboard after first round: (T1) Rory McIlroy  & Álvaro Quirós  65 (−7) (T3) Y. E. Yang  & K. J. Choi  67 (−5)

Ice hockey
NCAA Men's Frozen Four Semifinals in St. Paul, Minnesota:
Minnesota–Duluth 4, Notre Dame 3
Michigan 2, North Dakota 0

Rugby union
Amlin Challenge Cup quarter-finals:
La Rochelle  13–23  Clermont

April 6, 2011 (Wednesday)

Curling
World Men's Championship in Regina, Saskatchewan, Canada: (teams in bold advance to the playoffs)
Draw 12:
 2–9 
 8–4 
 4–9 
 7–8 
Draw 13:
 10–6 
 6–5 
 3–7 
 5–9 
Draw 14:
 4–5 
 7–5 
 7–4 
 6–5 
Standings (after Draw 14): Canada 9–0; Scotland 7–2; France 6–3; Germany, Norway, Sweden, Switzerland 5–4; China 4–5; Czech Republic, United States 3–6; South Korea 2–7; Denmark 0–9.

Cycling
UCI World Tour:
Tour of the Basque Country, Stage 3:  Alexander Vinokourov  4h 20' 38" (2) Óscar Freire  + 8" (3) Paul Martens  + 8"
General classification (after stage 3): (1) Joaquim Rodríguez    12h 30' 09" (2) Andreas Klöden  + 0" (3) Samuel Sánchez  + 0"

Football (soccer)
CONCACAF Under-20 Championship in Guatemala City, Guatemala:
Quarterfinals: (winners qualify for FIFA U-20 World Cup)
 0–2 
 1–2 
South American Under-17 Championship in Quito, Ecuador: (teams in bold qualify for the FIFA U-17 World Cup and Pan American Games)
Final stage:
 3–2 
 1–2 
 3–1 
Standings (after 4 matches): Brazil 10 points, Uruguay 8, Argentina 7, Ecuador 5, Colombia, Paraguay 1.
UEFA Champions League Quarter-finals, first leg:
Chelsea  0–1  Manchester United
Barcelona  5–1  Shakhtar Donetsk
Copa Libertadores second stage:
Group 3:
Nacional  2–0  Fluminense
América  2–1  Argentinos Juniors
Standings (after 5 matches): América 9 points, Argentinos Juniors, Nacional 7, Fluminense 5.
Group 4: Unión Española  1–2  Caracas
Standings: Caracas 9 points (5 matches),  Universidad Católica 7 (4),  Vélez Sársfield 6 (4), Unión Española 4 (5).
Group 5:
Deportivo Táchira  0–2  Cerro Porteño
Santos  3–2  Colo-Colo
Standings (after 4 matches): Cerro Porteño 8 points, Colo-Colo 6, Santos 5, Deportivo Táchira 2.
Group 6: Chiapas  1–0  Internacional
Standings: Internacional 10 points (5 matches), Jaguares 9 (5),  Emelec 7 (4),  Jorge Wilstermann 0 (4).
AFC Champions League group stage, matchday 3:
Group B: Esteghlal  4–2  Pakhtakor
Standings (after 3 matches):  Al-Sadd 7 points, Esteghlal,  Al-Nassr 4, Pakhtakor 1.
Group D:
Al-Rayyan  1–3  Zob Ahan
Al-Shabab  4–1  Emirates
Standings (after 3 matches): Zob Ahan 7 points, Al-Shabab 5, Emirates 3, Al-Rayyan 1.
Group F:
Nagoya Grampus  1–1  FC Seoul
Hangzhou Greentown  0–0  Al-Ain
Standings: FC Seoul 7 points (3 matches), Hangzhou Greentown 4 (3), Al-Ain, Nagoya Grampus 1 (2).
Group H:
Sydney FC  1–1  Shanghai Shenhua
Suwon Samsung Bluewings  1–1  Kashima Antlers
Standings: Suwon Samsung Bluewings 5 points (3 matches), Kashima Antlers, Sydney FC 2 (2), Shanghai Shenhua 2 (3).
CONCACAF Champions League Semifinals, second leg (first leg score in parentheses):
Cruz Azul  1–1 (1–2)  Monterrey. Monterrey win 3–2 on aggregate.

April 5, 2011 (Tuesday)

Basketball
NCAA Division I Women's Tournament:
Championship Game in Indianapolis: Texas A&M 76, Notre Dame 70
The Aggies finish their first Final Four appearance with their first national title.

Curling
World Men's Championship in Regina, Saskatchewan, Canada:
Draw 9:
 3–5 
 7–4 
 8–7 
 8–4 
Draw 10:
 8–6 
 5–11 
 7–6 
 8–10 
Draw 11:
 9–3 
 9–3 
 10–3 
 7–3 
Standings (after Draw 11): Canada 7–0; Scotland 6–1; France, Sweden, Switzerland 5–2; Germany, Norway 3–4; China, Czech Republic, South Korea, United States 2–5; Denmark 0–7.

Cycling
UCI World Tour:
Tour of the Basque Country, Stage 2:  Vasil Kiryienka  4h 06' 39"  Andreas Klöden  + 2"  Andy Schleck  + 2"
General classification (after stage 2): (1) Klöden   8h 09' 23" (2) Joaquim Rodríguez  + 0" (3) Samuel Sánchez  + 0"

Football (soccer)
CONCACAF Under-20 Championship in Guatemala City, Guatemala:
Quarterfinals: (winners qualify for FIFA U-20 World Cup)
 6–1 
 3–0 
UEFA Champions League Quarter-finals, first leg:
Real Madrid  4–0  Tottenham Hotspur
Internazionale  2–5  Schalke 04
Copa Libertadores second stage (team in bold advance to the knockout stage):
Group 8: Independiente  1–1  LDU Quito
Standings (after 5 matches):  Peñarol 9 points, LDU Quito,  Godoy Cruz 7, Independiente 5.
AFC Champions League group stage, matchday 3: (team in bold advances to the Round of 16)
Group A:
Sepahan  2–0  Al-Gharafa
Al-Hilal  3–1  Al-Jazira
Standings (after 3 matches): Sepahan 9 points, Al-Hilal 6, Al-Gharafa, Al-Jazira 1.
Group B: Al-Sadd  1–0  Al-Nassr
Standings: Al-Sadd 7 points (3 matches), Al-Nassr 4 (3),  Pakhtakor,  Esteghlal 1 (2).
Group C:
Bunyodkor  0–0  Persepolis
Al-Wahda  0–3  Al-Ittihad
Standings (after 3 matches): Al-Ittihad 9 points, Al-Wahda, Bunyodkor, Persepolis 2.
Group E:
Jeju United  2–1  Gamba Osaka
Tianjin Teda  1–1  Melbourne Victory
Standings (after 3 matches): Tianjin Teda 7 points, Jeju United 6, Gamba Osaka 3, Melbourne Victory 1.
Group G:
Arema  1–1  Shandong Luneng
Cerezo Osaka  1–0  Jeonbuk Hyundai Motors
Standings (after 3 matches): Jeonbuk Hyundai Motors, Cerezo Osaka 6 points, Shandong Luneng 4, Arema 1.
CONCACAF Champions League Semifinals, second leg (first leg score in parentheses):
Saprissa  2–1 (0–2)  Real Salt Lake. Real Salt Lake advance 3–2 on aggregate.

April 4, 2011 (Monday)

Basketball
NCAA Division I Men's Tournament:
Championship Game in Houston (seeds with regionals in parentheses):
(West 3) Connecticut 53, (Southeast 8) Butler 41
The Huskies win their third national championship and first since 2004. The Bulldogs become the first team to lose in successive title games since Michigan's Fab Five in 1992 and 1993.
Basketball Hall of Fame Class of 2011:
Players: Teresa Edwards, Artis Gilmore, Chris Mullin, Dennis Rodman, Arvydas Sabonis, Reece "Goose" Tatum
Coaches: Herb Magee, Tara VanDerveer, Tex Winter
Contributors: Tom "Satch" Sanders

Curling
World Men's Championship in Regina, Saskatchewan, Canada:
Draw 6:
 8–5 
 1–9 
 7–4 
 8–5 
Draw 7:
 8–5 
 5–4 
 5–4 
 1–7 
Draw 8:
 3–5 
 10–5 
 8–6 
 6–5 
Standings (after Draw 8): Canada, Scotland 5–0; France 4–1; Sweden, Switzerland 3–2; China, Czech Republic, Germany, Norway 2–3; South Korea, United States 1–4; Denmark 0–5.

Cycling
UCI World Tour:
Tour of the Basque Country, Stage 1 & General classification:  Joaquim Rodríguez    4h 02' 42"  Samuel Sánchez  s.t.  Andreas Klöden  s.t.

April 3, 2011 (Sunday)

Auto racing
Sprint Cup Series:
Goody's Fast Relief 500 in Ridgeway, Virginia: (1)  Kevin Harvick (Chevrolet; Richard Childress Racing) (2)  Dale Earnhardt Jr. (Chevrolet; Hendrick Motorsports) (3)  Kyle Busch (Toyota; Joe Gibbs Racing)
Drivers' championship standings (after 6 of 36 races): (1) Busch 219 points (2)  Carl Edwards (Ford; Roush Fenway Racing) 214 (3)  Jimmie Johnson (Chevrolet; Hendrick Motorsports) 207

Basketball
Women's Division I Tournament – Final Four in Indianapolis (seeds with regionals in parentheses):
(Dallas 2) Texas A&M 63, (Spokane 1) Stanford 62
(Dayton 2) Notre Dame 72, (Philadelphia 1) Connecticut 63

Curling
World Men's Championship in Regina, Saskatchewan, Canada:
Draw 3:
 7–5 
 6–4 
Draw 4:
 6–9 
 7–4 
 7–6 
 7–6 
Draw 5:
 11–2 
 10–6 
 8–9 
 8–5 
Standings (after Draw 5): Canada, Scotland 3–0; China, Czech Republic, France, Sweden 2–1; Germany, Norway, Switzerland, United States 1–2; Denmark, South Korea 0–3.

Cycling
UCI World Tour:
Tour of Flanders:  Nick Nuyens  6h 00' 42"  Sylvain Chavanel  s.t.  Fabian Cancellara  s.t.
World Tour standings (after 7 of 27 races): (1) Matthew Goss  203 points (2) Michele Scarponi  202 (3) Cancellara 156

Football (soccer)
South American Under-17 Championship in Ecuador:
Final stage:
 1–3 
 2–1 
 3–1 
Standings (after 3 matches): Brazil, Argentina 7 points, Uruguay 5, Ecuador 2, Colombia, Paraguay 1.
CAF Champions League First round, second leg: (first leg score in parentheses)
Simba  2–3 (1–3)  TP Mazembe. TP Mazembe win 6–3 on aggregate.
Enyimba  2–1 (0–0)  US Bitam. Enyimba win 2–1 on aggregate.
Cotonsport  1–0 (1–0)  AS Vita Club. Cotonsport win 2–0 on aggregate.
ASPAC  2–0 (0–5)  Espérance ST. Espérance ST win 5–2 on aggregate.
Kano Pillars  0–0 (0–2)  Wydad Casablanca. Wydad Casablanca win 2–0 on aggregate.
ASFA Yennenga  3–4 (0–2)  ES Sétif. ES Sétif win 6–3 on aggregate.
MC Alger  3–0 (1–4)  Dynamos. 4–4 on aggregate, MC Alger win on away goals.
CAF Confederation Cup First round, second leg: (first leg score in parentheses)
AS Adema  2–0 (1–1)  Wits. AS Adema win 3–1 on aggregate.
Foullah Edifice  1–0 (0–2)  Kaduna United. Kaduna United win 2–1 on aggregate.
AC Léopard  1–0 (0–2)  1º de Agosto. 1º de Agosto win 2–1 on aggregate.
Tiko United  0–1 (0–2)  Sunshine Stars. Sunshine Stars win 3–0 on aggregate.
Motema Pembe  1–0 (1–1)  Victors. Motema Pembe win 2–1 on aggregate.
Sahel SC  1–2 (0–0)  Maghreb Fez. Maghreb Fez win 2–1 on aggregate.
Ashanti Gold  2–1 (0–3)  Étoile Sahel. Étoile Sahel win 4–2 on aggregate.
CAF Confederation Cup First round, only leg: USFA  –  Africa Sports postponed
 Primeira Liga, matchday 25 (teams in bold qualify for the Champions League):
Benfica 1–2 Porto
Standings: Porto 71 points, Benfica 55, Braga 40
Porto win the title for the 25th time.

Golf
Women's major:
Kraft Nabisco Championship in Rancho Mirage, California, United States:
Final leaderboard (USA unless stated): (1) Stacy Lewis 275 (−13) (2) Yani Tseng  278 (−10) (T3) Katie Futcher, Morgan Pressel & Angela Stanford 284 (−4)
Lewis becomes the first player to win a major as her first LPGA Tour victory since Anna Nordqvist  won the 2009 LPGA Championship.
PGA Tour:
Shell Houston Open in Humble, Texas:
Winner: Phil Mickelson  268 (−20)
Mickelson wins his 39th PGA Tour title.
European Tour:
Trophée Hassan II in Agadir, Morocco:
Winner: David Horsey  274 (−13)PO
Horsey defeats defending champion Rhys Davies  & Jaco van Zyl  on the second playoff hole to win his second European Tour title.
Champions Tour:
Mississippi Gulf Resort Classic in Biloxi, Mississippi:
Winner: Tom Lehman  200 (−16)
Lehman wins for the second time this season, and fourth time on the Champions Tour.

Motorcycle racing
Moto GP:
Spanish Grand Prix in Jerez, Spain:
MotoGP: (1) Jorge Lorenzo  (Yamaha) (2) Dani Pedrosa  (Honda) (3) Nicky Hayden  (Ducati)
Riders' championship standings (after 2 of 18 races): (1) Lorenzo 45 points (2) Pedrosa 36 (3) Casey Stoner  (Honda) 25
Moto2: (1) Andrea Iannone  (Suter) (2) Thomas Lüthi  (Suter) (3) Simone Corsi  (FTR)
Riders' championship standings (after 2 of 17 races): (1) Iannone 45 points (2) Stefan Bradl  (Kalex) & Lüthi 36
125cc: (1) Nicolás Terol  (Aprilia) (2) Jonas Folger  (Aprilia) (3) Johann Zarco  (Derbi)
Riders' championship standings (after 2 of 17 races): (1) Terol 50 points (2) Folger 31 (3) Sandro Cortese  (Aprilia) 30

Rugby union
IRB Sevens World Series:
Adelaide Sevens in Adelaide:
Shield:  17–12 
Bowl:  12–33 
Plate:  26–19 
Cup:  29–17 
Standings (after 6 of 8 competitions): (1) New Zealand 134 points (2) England 121 (3)  100

Snooker
China Open in Beijing, China:
Final: Judd Trump  10–8 Mark Selby 
Trump wins his first ranking and fourth professional title.

Tennis
ATP World Tour:
Sony Ericsson Open in Miami, United States:
Final: Novak Djokovic  def. Rafael Nadal  4–6, 6–3, 7–6(4)
Djokovic defeats Nadal in a final for the second time in three weeks, winning the tournament for the second time, for his fourth title of the year and 22nd of his career. He also extends his match record in 2011 to 24–0.

Wrestling
European Championships in Dortmund, Germany:
Men Greco-Roman:
60 kg:  Revaz Lashkhi   Ivo Angelov   Mustafa Saglam  & Hasan Aliyev 
74 kg:  Rafig Huseynov   Péter Bácsi   Roman Vlasov  & Christophe Guenot 
96 kg:  Tsimafei Dzeinichenka   Artur Aleksanyan   Shalva Gadabadze  & Elis Guri

April 2, 2011 (Saturday)

Basketball
Men's Division I Tournament – Final Four in Houston (seeds with regionals in parentheses):
(Southeast 8) Butler 70, (Southwest 11) Virginia Commonwealth 62
The Bulldogs become the first team to reach two consecutive championship games since Florida won the 2006 and 2007 national championships.
(West 3) Connecticut 56, (East 4) Kentucky 55
The Huskies reach the championship game for the third time.
Women's National Invitation Tournament Final in Toledo, Ohio:
Toledo 76, USC 68
The Rockets win their first postseason championship of any type.

Cricket
World Cup Final in Mumbai, India:  274/6 (50 overs; Mahela Jayawardene 103);  277/4 (48.2 overs). India win by 6 wickets.
India win the first all-Asian World Cup final, winning the tournament for the second time, and the first since 1983.

Curling
World Men's Championship in Regina, Saskatchewan, Canada:
Draw 1:
 8–4 
 7–4 
 5–9 
 8–7 
Draw 2:
 4–6 
 8–2 
 6–7 
 5–9

Football (soccer)
CONCACAF U-20 Championship in Guatemala (teams in bold advance to the quarterfinals):
Group A:  1–3 
Final standings: Honduras 6 points, Guatemala 3,  0.
Group B:  2–0 
Final standings: United States 6 points, Panama 3,  0.
OFC Champions League Final, first leg:
Amicale  1–2  Auckland City
CAF Champions League First round, second leg: (first leg score in parentheses)
Recreativo Caála  1–1 (0–3)  Al-Hilal. Al-Hilal win 4–1 on aggregate.
Zamalek  2–1 (2–4)  Club Africain. Match abandoned due to crowd violence.
Inter Luanda  2–0 (0–2)  Al-Merreikh. 2–2 on aggregate; Inter Luanda win 3–2 on penalties.
Djoliba  1–1 (0–3)  Diaraf. Diaraf win 4–1 on aggregate.
SuperSport United  1–0 (0–2)  Al-Ahly. Al-Ahly win 2–1 on aggregate.
Raja Casablanca  1–0 (1–2)  Stade Malien. 2–2 on aggregate; Raja Casablanca win on away goals.
Young Buffaloes  0–2 (0–5)  ZESCO United. ZESCO United win 7–0 on aggregate.
CAF Confederation Cup First round, second leg: (first leg score in parentheses)
Nchanga Rangers  0–2 (0–1)  Saint Eloi Lupopo. Saint Eloi Lupopo win 3–0 on aggregate.
Dedebit  1–1 (0–4)  Haras El Hodood. Haras El Hodood win 5–1 on aggregate.
Missile  2–1 (1–1)  Al-Nil Al-Hasahesa. Missile win 3–2 on aggregate.
Touré Kunda Footpro  2–1 (0–2)  FUS de Rabat. FUS de Rabat win 3–2 on aggregate.
Sofapaka  4–0 (0–2)  Ismaily. Sofapaka win 4–2 on aggregate.
Difaa El Jadida  3–0 (0–2)  Olympique Béja. Difaa El Jadida win 3–2 on aggregate.
ASC Tevragh-Zeïna  1–2 (0–1)  JS Kabylie. JS Kabylie win 3–1 on aggregate.
 Irish League Cup in Lurgan:
Lisburn Distillery 2–1 Portadown
Distillery win the Cup for the first time.

Golf
Women's major:
Kraft Nabisco Championship in Rancho Mirage, California, United States:
Leaderboard after third round (USA unless indicated): (1) Yani Tseng  204 (−12) (2) Stacy Lewis 206 (−10) (3) Morgan Pressel 208 (−8)

Judo
Pan American Championships in Guadalajara, Mexico:
Men's 55 kg:  Fredy López   Youssef Youssef   Hernan Birbrier  & Jordi Villegas 
Men's 60 kg:  Felipe Kitadai   Nabor Castillo   Frazer Will  & Antonio Bentancourt 
Men's 66 kg:  Leandro Cunha   Ricardo Valderrama   Angelo Gómez  & Michal Popiel 
Men's 73 kg:  Bruno Mendonça   Ronald Girones   Nick Delpopolo  & Nicholas Tritton 
Women's 44 kg:  Diana Cobos   Silvia González   Alexa Liddie 
Women's 48 kg:  Paula Pareto   Dayaris Mestre   Taciana Lima  & Edna Carrillo 
Women's 52 kg:  Yanet Bermoy   Linouse Desravine   Angelica Delgado  & Érika Miranda 
Women's 57 kg:  Yurisleidy Lupetey   Marti Malloy   Joliane Melançon  & Rafaela Silva

Snooker
China Open in Beijing, China, semi-finals:
Shaun Murphy  1–6 Judd Trump 
Ding Junhui  3–6 Mark Selby

Tennis
WTA Tour:
Sony Ericsson Open in Miami, United States:
Final: Victoria Azarenka  def. Maria Sharapova  6–1, 6–4
Azarenka wins the tournament for the second time, and her sixth WTA Tour title.

Wrestling
European Championships in Dortmund, Germany:
Men Greco-Roman:
55 kg:  Roman Amoyan   Vyugar Ragymov   Elbek Tazhyiev  & Eldaniz Azizli 
66 kg:  Ambako Vachadze   Tamás Lórincz   Vitaliy Rahimov  & Aleksandar Maksimovic 
84 kg:  Vasyl Rachyba   Alan Khugaev   Artur Shahinyan  & Hristo Marinov 
120 kg:  Khasan Baroyev   Rıza Kayaalp   Yuri Patrikeyev  & Mihály Deák-Bárdos

April 1, 2011 (Friday)

Basketball
College Basketball Invitational Final (best-of-3), Game 3 in Eugene, Oregon:
Oregon 71, Creighton 69. Oregon wins series 2–1.

Football (soccer)
CONCACAF U-20 Championship in Guatemala (teams in bold advance to the quarterfinals):
Group C:  3–0 
Final standings: Costa Rica 6 points, Canada 3,  0.
Group D:  5–0 
Final standings: Mexico 6 points, Trinidad and Tobago 1.

Golf
Women's major:
Kraft Nabisco Championship in Rancho Mirage, California, United States:
 Leaderboard after second round (USA unless stated): (1) Stacy Lewis 135 (−9) (T2) Yani Tseng , Jane Park & Brittany Lincicome 138 (−6)

Judo
Pan American Championships in Guadalajara, Mexico:
Men's 81 kg:  Leandro Guilheiro   Travis Stevens   Emmanuel Lucenti  & Antonie Valois-Fortier 
Men's 90 kg:  Asley González   Alexandre Emond   Rodrigo Luna  & José Camacho 
Men's 100 kg:  Oreidis Despaigne   Leonardo Leite   Cristian Schimidt  & Kyle Vashkulat 
Men's +100 kg:  Oscar Braison   Rafael Silva   Orlando Baccino  & Luis Ignacio Salazar 
Women's 63 kg:  Yaritza Abel   Mariana Silva   Christal Ransom  & Myriam Lamarche 
Women's 70 kg:  Onix Cortés   Maria Portela   Kelita Zupancic  & Yuri Alvear 
Women's 78 kg:  Kayla Harrison   Mayra Aguiar   Anny Cortez  & Yalennis Castillo 
Women's +78 kg:  Idalys Ortiz   Vanessa Zambotti   Melissa Mojica  & Maria Suelen Altheman

Snooker
China Open in Beijing, China, quarter-finals:
John Higgins  2–5 Shaun Murphy 
Judd Trump  5–1 Peter Ebdon 
Stephen Lee  2–5 Ding Junhui 
Mark Selby  5–1 Ali Carter

Wrestling
European Championships in Dortmund, Germany:
Women:
59 kg:  Yuliya Ratkevich   Georgiana Paic   Olga Butkevych  & Ganna Vasylenko 
63 kg:  Yuliya Ostapchuk   Taybe Yusein   Inna Trazhukova  & Olesya Zamula 
67 kg:  Nadya Sementsova   Alina Makhynia   Yvonne English  & Hanna Savenia 
72 kg:  Kateryna Burmistrova   Vasilisa Marzaliuk   Stanka Zlateva  & Agnieszka Wieszczek

References

4